

225001–225100 

|-bgcolor=#fefefe
| 225001 ||  || — || March 12, 2007 || Mount Lemmon || Mount Lemmon Survey || — || align=right | 1.2 km || 
|-id=002 bgcolor=#E9E9E9
| 225002 ||  || — || March 12, 2007 || Kitt Peak || Spacewatch || HNS || align=right | 2.4 km || 
|-id=003 bgcolor=#E9E9E9
| 225003 ||  || — || March 15, 2007 || Socorro || LINEAR || — || align=right | 4.7 km || 
|-id=004 bgcolor=#E9E9E9
| 225004 ||  || — || March 11, 2007 || Catalina || CSS || — || align=right | 2.2 km || 
|-id=005 bgcolor=#d6d6d6
| 225005 ||  || — || March 11, 2007 || Mount Lemmon || Mount Lemmon Survey || HYG || align=right | 4.3 km || 
|-id=006 bgcolor=#E9E9E9
| 225006 ||  || — || March 11, 2007 || Kitt Peak || Spacewatch || MRX || align=right | 1.2 km || 
|-id=007 bgcolor=#fefefe
| 225007 ||  || — || March 12, 2007 || Kitt Peak || Spacewatch || NYS || align=right data-sort-value="0.84" | 840 m || 
|-id=008 bgcolor=#E9E9E9
| 225008 ||  || — || March 12, 2007 || Catalina || CSS || — || align=right | 2.8 km || 
|-id=009 bgcolor=#d6d6d6
| 225009 ||  || — || March 13, 2007 || Kitt Peak || Spacewatch || — || align=right | 4.1 km || 
|-id=010 bgcolor=#d6d6d6
| 225010 ||  || — || March 14, 2007 || Kitt Peak || Spacewatch || — || align=right | 4.2 km || 
|-id=011 bgcolor=#d6d6d6
| 225011 ||  || — || March 14, 2007 || Kitt Peak || Spacewatch || EOS || align=right | 2.8 km || 
|-id=012 bgcolor=#E9E9E9
| 225012 ||  || — || March 12, 2007 || Črni Vrh || Črni Vrh || — || align=right | 2.2 km || 
|-id=013 bgcolor=#d6d6d6
| 225013 ||  || — || March 13, 2007 || Mount Lemmon || Mount Lemmon Survey || — || align=right | 2.8 km || 
|-id=014 bgcolor=#E9E9E9
| 225014 ||  || — || March 13, 2007 || Mount Lemmon || Mount Lemmon Survey || WIT || align=right | 1.4 km || 
|-id=015 bgcolor=#d6d6d6
| 225015 ||  || — || March 15, 2007 || Kitt Peak || Spacewatch || — || align=right | 5.1 km || 
|-id=016 bgcolor=#d6d6d6
| 225016 ||  || — || March 9, 2007 || Kitt Peak || Spacewatch || — || align=right | 3.2 km || 
|-id=017 bgcolor=#E9E9E9
| 225017 ||  || — || March 10, 2007 || Mount Lemmon || Mount Lemmon Survey || XIZ || align=right | 1.5 km || 
|-id=018 bgcolor=#fefefe
| 225018 ||  || — || March 13, 2007 || Anderson Mesa || LONEOS || ERI || align=right | 2.3 km || 
|-id=019 bgcolor=#d6d6d6
| 225019 ||  || — || March 10, 2007 || Mount Lemmon || Mount Lemmon Survey || — || align=right | 3.5 km || 
|-id=020 bgcolor=#d6d6d6
| 225020 ||  || — || March 12, 2007 || Kitt Peak || Spacewatch || — || align=right | 2.8 km || 
|-id=021 bgcolor=#E9E9E9
| 225021 || 2007 FL || — || March 16, 2007 || Mount Lemmon || Mount Lemmon Survey || PAD || align=right | 3.8 km || 
|-id=022 bgcolor=#E9E9E9
| 225022 ||  || — || March 17, 2007 || Socorro || LINEAR || MIS || align=right | 3.1 km || 
|-id=023 bgcolor=#d6d6d6
| 225023 ||  || — || March 16, 2007 || Kitt Peak || Spacewatch || — || align=right | 4.9 km || 
|-id=024 bgcolor=#E9E9E9
| 225024 ||  || — || March 17, 2007 || Anderson Mesa || LONEOS || — || align=right | 1.6 km || 
|-id=025 bgcolor=#E9E9E9
| 225025 ||  || — || March 20, 2007 || Mount Lemmon || Mount Lemmon Survey || AST || align=right | 1.7 km || 
|-id=026 bgcolor=#E9E9E9
| 225026 ||  || — || March 20, 2007 || Anderson Mesa || LONEOS || — || align=right | 2.5 km || 
|-id=027 bgcolor=#fefefe
| 225027 ||  || — || March 20, 2007 || Mount Lemmon || Mount Lemmon Survey || — || align=right | 1.0 km || 
|-id=028 bgcolor=#d6d6d6
| 225028 ||  || — || March 20, 2007 || Kitt Peak || Spacewatch || EOS || align=right | 3.0 km || 
|-id=029 bgcolor=#d6d6d6
| 225029 ||  || — || March 20, 2007 || Mount Lemmon || Mount Lemmon Survey || — || align=right | 3.7 km || 
|-id=030 bgcolor=#d6d6d6
| 225030 ||  || — || March 20, 2007 || Kitt Peak || Spacewatch || KOR || align=right | 1.4 km || 
|-id=031 bgcolor=#E9E9E9
| 225031 ||  || — || March 20, 2007 || Mount Lemmon || Mount Lemmon Survey || — || align=right | 2.3 km || 
|-id=032 bgcolor=#E9E9E9
| 225032 ||  || — || March 20, 2007 || Mount Lemmon || Mount Lemmon Survey || HEN || align=right | 1.3 km || 
|-id=033 bgcolor=#E9E9E9
| 225033 Maskoliunas ||  ||  || March 23, 2007 || Moletai || K. Černis, J. Zdanavičius || GEF || align=right | 2.2 km || 
|-id=034 bgcolor=#d6d6d6
| 225034 ||  || — || March 17, 2007 || Anderson Mesa || LONEOS || — || align=right | 4.9 km || 
|-id=035 bgcolor=#E9E9E9
| 225035 ||  || — || March 26, 2007 || Mount Lemmon || Mount Lemmon Survey || — || align=right | 1.4 km || 
|-id=036 bgcolor=#fefefe
| 225036 ||  || — || March 26, 2007 || Mount Lemmon || Mount Lemmon Survey || — || align=right data-sort-value="0.73" | 730 m || 
|-id=037 bgcolor=#d6d6d6
| 225037 ||  || — || March 16, 2007 || Mount Lemmon || Mount Lemmon Survey || THM || align=right | 2.8 km || 
|-id=038 bgcolor=#fefefe
| 225038 ||  || — || April 7, 2007 || Mount Lemmon || Mount Lemmon Survey || — || align=right data-sort-value="0.77" | 770 m || 
|-id=039 bgcolor=#E9E9E9
| 225039 ||  || — || April 11, 2007 || 7300 Observatory || W. K. Y. Yeung || — || align=right | 3.2 km || 
|-id=040 bgcolor=#d6d6d6
| 225040 ||  || — || April 14, 2007 || Jarnac || Jarnac Obs. || — || align=right | 3.2 km || 
|-id=041 bgcolor=#d6d6d6
| 225041 ||  || — || April 7, 2007 || Mount Lemmon || Mount Lemmon Survey || — || align=right | 4.8 km || 
|-id=042 bgcolor=#d6d6d6
| 225042 ||  || — || April 8, 2007 || Siding Spring || SSS || — || align=right | 5.0 km || 
|-id=043 bgcolor=#d6d6d6
| 225043 ||  || — || April 11, 2007 || Kitt Peak || Spacewatch || TIR || align=right | 4.0 km || 
|-id=044 bgcolor=#E9E9E9
| 225044 ||  || — || April 11, 2007 || Kitt Peak || Spacewatch || — || align=right | 3.5 km || 
|-id=045 bgcolor=#d6d6d6
| 225045 ||  || — || April 11, 2007 || Kitt Peak || Spacewatch || — || align=right | 3.2 km || 
|-id=046 bgcolor=#d6d6d6
| 225046 ||  || — || April 11, 2007 || Kitt Peak || Spacewatch || EMA || align=right | 3.4 km || 
|-id=047 bgcolor=#d6d6d6
| 225047 ||  || — || April 11, 2007 || Kitt Peak || Spacewatch || — || align=right | 4.1 km || 
|-id=048 bgcolor=#d6d6d6
| 225048 ||  || — || April 11, 2007 || Kitt Peak || Spacewatch || — || align=right | 6.0 km || 
|-id=049 bgcolor=#d6d6d6
| 225049 ||  || — || April 11, 2007 || Siding Spring || SSS || — || align=right | 6.0 km || 
|-id=050 bgcolor=#d6d6d6
| 225050 ||  || — || April 14, 2007 || Kitt Peak || Spacewatch || — || align=right | 4.1 km || 
|-id=051 bgcolor=#d6d6d6
| 225051 ||  || — || April 14, 2007 || Kitt Peak || Spacewatch || TIR || align=right | 5.2 km || 
|-id=052 bgcolor=#d6d6d6
| 225052 ||  || — || April 14, 2007 || Kitt Peak || Spacewatch || — || align=right | 3.8 km || 
|-id=053 bgcolor=#E9E9E9
| 225053 ||  || — || April 15, 2007 || Mount Lemmon || Mount Lemmon Survey || HOF || align=right | 3.3 km || 
|-id=054 bgcolor=#E9E9E9
| 225054 ||  || — || April 15, 2007 || Catalina || CSS || BRG || align=right | 2.0 km || 
|-id=055 bgcolor=#d6d6d6
| 225055 ||  || — || April 15, 2007 || Catalina || CSS || — || align=right | 3.1 km || 
|-id=056 bgcolor=#d6d6d6
| 225056 ||  || — || April 15, 2007 || Catalina || CSS || EOS || align=right | 3.1 km || 
|-id=057 bgcolor=#d6d6d6
| 225057 || 2007 HK || — || April 16, 2007 || Altschwendt || W. Ries || K-2 || align=right | 1.7 km || 
|-id=058 bgcolor=#d6d6d6
| 225058 ||  || — || April 16, 2007 || Mount Lemmon || Mount Lemmon Survey || — || align=right | 3.7 km || 
|-id=059 bgcolor=#d6d6d6
| 225059 ||  || — || April 16, 2007 || Catalina || CSS || ALA || align=right | 4.4 km || 
|-id=060 bgcolor=#d6d6d6
| 225060 ||  || — || April 16, 2007 || 7300 Observatory || W. K. Y. Yeung || 7:4 || align=right | 5.4 km || 
|-id=061 bgcolor=#d6d6d6
| 225061 ||  || — || April 18, 2007 || Mount Lemmon || Mount Lemmon Survey || — || align=right | 3.4 km || 
|-id=062 bgcolor=#E9E9E9
| 225062 ||  || — || April 18, 2007 || Mount Lemmon || Mount Lemmon Survey || — || align=right | 1.6 km || 
|-id=063 bgcolor=#d6d6d6
| 225063 ||  || — || April 20, 2007 || Lulin Observatory || LUSS || — || align=right | 4.8 km || 
|-id=064 bgcolor=#d6d6d6
| 225064 ||  || — || April 18, 2007 || Kitt Peak || Spacewatch || — || align=right | 4.5 km || 
|-id=065 bgcolor=#d6d6d6
| 225065 ||  || — || April 19, 2007 || Mount Lemmon || Mount Lemmon Survey || — || align=right | 2.6 km || 
|-id=066 bgcolor=#E9E9E9
| 225066 ||  || — || April 16, 2007 || Catalina || CSS || — || align=right | 2.5 km || 
|-id=067 bgcolor=#d6d6d6
| 225067 ||  || — || April 20, 2007 || Kitt Peak || Spacewatch || HYG || align=right | 4.5 km || 
|-id=068 bgcolor=#d6d6d6
| 225068 ||  || — || April 18, 2007 || Mount Lemmon || Mount Lemmon Survey || KOR || align=right | 1.7 km || 
|-id=069 bgcolor=#d6d6d6
| 225069 ||  || — || April 20, 2007 || Mount Lemmon || Mount Lemmon Survey || THM || align=right | 3.2 km || 
|-id=070 bgcolor=#d6d6d6
| 225070 ||  || — || April 22, 2007 || Mount Lemmon || Mount Lemmon Survey || — || align=right | 3.9 km || 
|-id=071 bgcolor=#d6d6d6
| 225071 ||  || — || April 25, 2007 || Tiki || S. F. Hönig, N. Teamo || — || align=right | 4.1 km || 
|-id=072 bgcolor=#d6d6d6
| 225072 ||  || — || April 22, 2007 || Kitt Peak || Spacewatch || — || align=right | 3.8 km || 
|-id=073 bgcolor=#E9E9E9
| 225073 ||  || — || April 23, 2007 || Catalina || CSS || — || align=right | 2.8 km || 
|-id=074 bgcolor=#d6d6d6
| 225074 ||  || — || April 18, 2007 || Mount Lemmon || Mount Lemmon Survey || — || align=right | 3.5 km || 
|-id=075 bgcolor=#d6d6d6
| 225075 ||  || — || April 19, 2007 || Mount Lemmon || Mount Lemmon Survey || — || align=right | 3.8 km || 
|-id=076 bgcolor=#d6d6d6
| 225076 Vallemare ||  ||  || May 8, 2007 || Vallemare di Borbona || V. S. Casulli || — || align=right | 5.1 km || 
|-id=077 bgcolor=#d6d6d6
| 225077 ||  || — || May 7, 2007 || Kitt Peak || Spacewatch || EOS || align=right | 3.0 km || 
|-id=078 bgcolor=#E9E9E9
| 225078 ||  || — || May 7, 2007 || Catalina || CSS || GEF || align=right | 1.9 km || 
|-id=079 bgcolor=#d6d6d6
| 225079 ||  || — || May 10, 2007 || Kitt Peak || Spacewatch || CHA || align=right | 3.3 km || 
|-id=080 bgcolor=#d6d6d6
| 225080 ||  || — || May 13, 2007 || Tiki || S. F. Hönig, N. Teamo || URS || align=right | 5.2 km || 
|-id=081 bgcolor=#d6d6d6
| 225081 ||  || — || May 9, 2007 || Mount Lemmon || Mount Lemmon Survey || — || align=right | 2.8 km || 
|-id=082 bgcolor=#d6d6d6
| 225082 ||  || — || May 10, 2007 || Mount Lemmon || Mount Lemmon Survey || — || align=right | 4.6 km || 
|-id=083 bgcolor=#d6d6d6
| 225083 ||  || — || May 24, 2007 || Mount Lemmon || Mount Lemmon Survey || TEL || align=right | 2.1 km || 
|-id=084 bgcolor=#d6d6d6
| 225084 ||  || — || May 25, 2007 || Mount Lemmon || Mount Lemmon Survey || — || align=right | 6.1 km || 
|-id=085 bgcolor=#d6d6d6
| 225085 ||  || — || June 8, 2007 || Kitt Peak || Spacewatch || — || align=right | 3.5 km || 
|-id=086 bgcolor=#d6d6d6
| 225086 ||  || — || June 8, 2007 || Kitt Peak || Spacewatch || — || align=right | 4.5 km || 
|-id=087 bgcolor=#d6d6d6
| 225087 ||  || — || June 8, 2007 || Catalina || CSS || HYG || align=right | 4.4 km || 
|-id=088 bgcolor=#C2E0FF
| 225088 Gonggong ||  ||  || July 17, 2007 || Palomar || M. E. Schwamb, M. E. Brown, D. L. Rabinowitz || res3:10mooncritical || align=right | 1840 km || 
|-id=089 bgcolor=#C2FFFF
| 225089 ||  || — || August 14, 2007 || Bisei SG Center || BATTeRS || L4 || align=right | 16 km || 
|-id=090 bgcolor=#E9E9E9
| 225090 ||  || — || October 6, 2007 || Socorro || LINEAR || WIT || align=right | 1.6 km || 
|-id=091 bgcolor=#C2FFFF
| 225091 ||  || — || October 14, 2007 || Mount Lemmon || Mount Lemmon Survey || L4 || align=right | 12 km || 
|-id=092 bgcolor=#fefefe
| 225092 ||  || — || January 10, 2008 || Mount Lemmon || Mount Lemmon Survey || NYS || align=right data-sort-value="0.83" | 830 m || 
|-id=093 bgcolor=#fefefe
| 225093 ||  || — || January 10, 2008 || Mount Lemmon || Mount Lemmon Survey || — || align=right data-sort-value="0.78" | 780 m || 
|-id=094 bgcolor=#fefefe
| 225094 ||  || — || February 1, 2008 || Kitt Peak || Spacewatch || — || align=right | 1.3 km || 
|-id=095 bgcolor=#fefefe
| 225095 ||  || — || February 8, 2008 || Kitt Peak || Spacewatch || — || align=right data-sort-value="0.87" | 870 m || 
|-id=096 bgcolor=#E9E9E9
| 225096 || 2008 DU || — || February 24, 2008 || Piszkéstető || K. Sárneczky || — || align=right | 2.8 km || 
|-id=097 bgcolor=#fefefe
| 225097 ||  || — || February 26, 2008 || Mount Lemmon || Mount Lemmon Survey || — || align=right | 1.0 km || 
|-id=098 bgcolor=#fefefe
| 225098 ||  || — || February 27, 2008 || Kitt Peak || Spacewatch || — || align=right | 1.1 km || 
|-id=099 bgcolor=#fefefe
| 225099 ||  || — || February 27, 2008 || Kitt Peak || Spacewatch || — || align=right data-sort-value="0.96" | 960 m || 
|-id=100 bgcolor=#fefefe
| 225100 ||  || — || February 27, 2008 || Kitt Peak || Spacewatch || — || align=right data-sort-value="0.99" | 990 m || 
|}

225101–225200 

|-bgcolor=#fefefe
| 225101 ||  || — || February 27, 2008 || Kitt Peak || Spacewatch || V || align=right | 1.1 km || 
|-id=102 bgcolor=#fefefe
| 225102 ||  || — || February 27, 2008 || Mount Lemmon || Mount Lemmon Survey || NYS || align=right data-sort-value="0.70" | 700 m || 
|-id=103 bgcolor=#E9E9E9
| 225103 ||  || — || February 27, 2008 || Kitt Peak || Spacewatch || — || align=right | 1.2 km || 
|-id=104 bgcolor=#E9E9E9
| 225104 ||  || — || February 29, 2008 || Kitt Peak || Spacewatch || — || align=right | 1.9 km || 
|-id=105 bgcolor=#fefefe
| 225105 ||  || — || February 29, 2008 || Kitt Peak || Spacewatch || FLO || align=right data-sort-value="0.71" | 710 m || 
|-id=106 bgcolor=#d6d6d6
| 225106 ||  || — || February 29, 2008 || Kitt Peak || Spacewatch || YAK || align=right | 3.0 km || 
|-id=107 bgcolor=#fefefe
| 225107 ||  || — || February 29, 2008 || Kitt Peak || Spacewatch || — || align=right | 1.0 km || 
|-id=108 bgcolor=#fefefe
| 225108 ||  || — || February 29, 2008 || Kitt Peak || Spacewatch || — || align=right data-sort-value="0.93" | 930 m || 
|-id=109 bgcolor=#fefefe
| 225109 ||  || — || February 28, 2008 || Mount Lemmon || Mount Lemmon Survey || FLO || align=right data-sort-value="0.83" | 830 m || 
|-id=110 bgcolor=#fefefe
| 225110 ||  || — || February 28, 2008 || Kitt Peak || Spacewatch || — || align=right | 1.2 km || 
|-id=111 bgcolor=#fefefe
| 225111 || 2008 ED || — || March 1, 2008 || Mount Lemmon || Mount Lemmon Survey || H || align=right data-sort-value="0.64" | 640 m || 
|-id=112 bgcolor=#fefefe
| 225112 ||  || — || March 2, 2008 || Kitt Peak || Spacewatch || — || align=right data-sort-value="0.76" | 760 m || 
|-id=113 bgcolor=#fefefe
| 225113 ||  || — || March 9, 2008 || Socorro || LINEAR || H || align=right data-sort-value="0.82" | 820 m || 
|-id=114 bgcolor=#fefefe
| 225114 ||  || — || March 1, 2008 || Kitt Peak || Spacewatch || NYS || align=right data-sort-value="0.99" | 990 m || 
|-id=115 bgcolor=#fefefe
| 225115 ||  || — || March 4, 2008 || Kitt Peak || Spacewatch || V || align=right data-sort-value="0.84" | 840 m || 
|-id=116 bgcolor=#fefefe
| 225116 ||  || — || March 5, 2008 || Kitt Peak || Spacewatch || NYS || align=right data-sort-value="0.73" | 730 m || 
|-id=117 bgcolor=#fefefe
| 225117 ||  || — || March 5, 2008 || Kitt Peak || Spacewatch || V || align=right | 1.0 km || 
|-id=118 bgcolor=#fefefe
| 225118 ||  || — || March 7, 2008 || Mount Lemmon || Mount Lemmon Survey || — || align=right | 1.1 km || 
|-id=119 bgcolor=#fefefe
| 225119 ||  || — || March 7, 2008 || Kitt Peak || Spacewatch || NYS || align=right data-sort-value="0.77" | 770 m || 
|-id=120 bgcolor=#fefefe
| 225120 ||  || — || March 5, 2008 || Socorro || LINEAR || V || align=right | 1.0 km || 
|-id=121 bgcolor=#fefefe
| 225121 ||  || — || March 6, 2008 || Mount Lemmon || Mount Lemmon Survey || H || align=right data-sort-value="0.79" | 790 m || 
|-id=122 bgcolor=#fefefe
| 225122 ||  || — || March 9, 2008 || Kitt Peak || Spacewatch || FLO || align=right data-sort-value="0.66" | 660 m || 
|-id=123 bgcolor=#fefefe
| 225123 ||  || — || March 11, 2008 || Kitt Peak || Spacewatch || — || align=right data-sort-value="0.95" | 950 m || 
|-id=124 bgcolor=#fefefe
| 225124 ||  || — || March 11, 2008 || Kitt Peak || Spacewatch || NYS || align=right data-sort-value="0.86" | 860 m || 
|-id=125 bgcolor=#fefefe
| 225125 ||  || — || March 11, 2008 || Kitt Peak || Spacewatch || NYS || align=right data-sort-value="0.68" | 680 m || 
|-id=126 bgcolor=#fefefe
| 225126 ||  || — || March 3, 2008 || Kitt Peak || Spacewatch || — || align=right data-sort-value="0.81" | 810 m || 
|-id=127 bgcolor=#fefefe
| 225127 ||  || — || March 26, 2008 || Kitt Peak || Spacewatch || — || align=right data-sort-value="0.90" | 900 m || 
|-id=128 bgcolor=#fefefe
| 225128 ||  || — || March 28, 2008 || Kitt Peak || Spacewatch || FLO || align=right data-sort-value="0.70" | 700 m || 
|-id=129 bgcolor=#E9E9E9
| 225129 ||  || — || March 28, 2008 || Mount Lemmon || Mount Lemmon Survey || — || align=right | 1.7 km || 
|-id=130 bgcolor=#fefefe
| 225130 ||  || — || March 29, 2008 || Kitt Peak || Spacewatch || — || align=right data-sort-value="0.94" | 940 m || 
|-id=131 bgcolor=#fefefe
| 225131 ||  || — || March 28, 2008 || Kitt Peak || Spacewatch || — || align=right | 1.1 km || 
|-id=132 bgcolor=#fefefe
| 225132 ||  || — || March 28, 2008 || Mount Lemmon || Mount Lemmon Survey || — || align=right data-sort-value="0.94" | 940 m || 
|-id=133 bgcolor=#E9E9E9
| 225133 ||  || — || March 28, 2008 || Mount Lemmon || Mount Lemmon Survey || EUN || align=right | 1.5 km || 
|-id=134 bgcolor=#E9E9E9
| 225134 ||  || — || March 28, 2008 || Kitt Peak || Spacewatch || — || align=right | 1.6 km || 
|-id=135 bgcolor=#fefefe
| 225135 ||  || — || March 27, 2008 || Mount Lemmon || Mount Lemmon Survey || — || align=right data-sort-value="0.92" | 920 m || 
|-id=136 bgcolor=#E9E9E9
| 225136 ||  || — || March 29, 2008 || Kitt Peak || Spacewatch || — || align=right | 1.2 km || 
|-id=137 bgcolor=#fefefe
| 225137 ||  || — || March 29, 2008 || Kitt Peak || Spacewatch || — || align=right | 1.3 km || 
|-id=138 bgcolor=#fefefe
| 225138 ||  || — || March 30, 2008 || Catalina || CSS || — || align=right | 1.7 km || 
|-id=139 bgcolor=#E9E9E9
| 225139 ||  || — || March 30, 2008 || Kitt Peak || Spacewatch || — || align=right | 1.6 km || 
|-id=140 bgcolor=#fefefe
| 225140 ||  || — || March 30, 2008 || Kitt Peak || Spacewatch || — || align=right | 1.2 km || 
|-id=141 bgcolor=#fefefe
| 225141 ||  || — || March 30, 2008 || Kitt Peak || Spacewatch || — || align=right | 1.2 km || 
|-id=142 bgcolor=#fefefe
| 225142 ||  || — || March 31, 2008 || Kitt Peak || Spacewatch || MAS || align=right data-sort-value="0.82" | 820 m || 
|-id=143 bgcolor=#fefefe
| 225143 ||  || — || March 29, 2008 || Kitt Peak || Spacewatch || V || align=right data-sort-value="0.62" | 620 m || 
|-id=144 bgcolor=#fefefe
| 225144 ||  || — || March 29, 2008 || Mount Lemmon || Mount Lemmon Survey || — || align=right | 1.2 km || 
|-id=145 bgcolor=#fefefe
| 225145 || 2008 GC || — || April 1, 2008 || Jarnac || Jarnac Obs. || — || align=right | 1.2 km || 
|-id=146 bgcolor=#fefefe
| 225146 ||  || — || April 2, 2008 || La Sagra || OAM Obs. || — || align=right | 1.1 km || 
|-id=147 bgcolor=#fefefe
| 225147 ||  || — || April 1, 2008 || Mount Lemmon || Mount Lemmon Survey || FLO || align=right data-sort-value="0.79" | 790 m || 
|-id=148 bgcolor=#fefefe
| 225148 ||  || — || April 1, 2008 || Mount Lemmon || Mount Lemmon Survey || KLI || align=right | 2.1 km || 
|-id=149 bgcolor=#fefefe
| 225149 ||  || — || April 1, 2008 || Mount Lemmon || Mount Lemmon Survey || — || align=right | 1.1 km || 
|-id=150 bgcolor=#d6d6d6
| 225150 ||  || — || April 4, 2008 || Kitt Peak || Spacewatch || VER || align=right | 3.8 km || 
|-id=151 bgcolor=#d6d6d6
| 225151 ||  || — || April 4, 2008 || Kitt Peak || Spacewatch || — || align=right | 5.0 km || 
|-id=152 bgcolor=#fefefe
| 225152 ||  || — || April 5, 2008 || Mount Lemmon || Mount Lemmon Survey || — || align=right | 1.4 km || 
|-id=153 bgcolor=#E9E9E9
| 225153 ||  || — || April 5, 2008 || Kitt Peak || Spacewatch || — || align=right | 2.2 km || 
|-id=154 bgcolor=#E9E9E9
| 225154 ||  || — || April 6, 2008 || Kitt Peak || Spacewatch || — || align=right data-sort-value="0.98" | 980 m || 
|-id=155 bgcolor=#fefefe
| 225155 ||  || — || April 6, 2008 || Kitt Peak || Spacewatch || FLO || align=right data-sort-value="0.69" | 690 m || 
|-id=156 bgcolor=#fefefe
| 225156 ||  || — || April 6, 2008 || Kitt Peak || Spacewatch || — || align=right data-sort-value="0.94" | 940 m || 
|-id=157 bgcolor=#E9E9E9
| 225157 ||  || — || April 6, 2008 || Mount Lemmon || Mount Lemmon Survey || — || align=right | 2.8 km || 
|-id=158 bgcolor=#fefefe
| 225158 ||  || — || April 7, 2008 || Kitt Peak || Spacewatch || V || align=right data-sort-value="0.72" | 720 m || 
|-id=159 bgcolor=#fefefe
| 225159 ||  || — || April 8, 2008 || Kitt Peak || Spacewatch || — || align=right | 2.7 km || 
|-id=160 bgcolor=#fefefe
| 225160 ||  || — || April 8, 2008 || Kitt Peak || Spacewatch || V || align=right | 1.0 km || 
|-id=161 bgcolor=#fefefe
| 225161 ||  || — || April 8, 2008 || Kitt Peak || Spacewatch || NYS || align=right data-sort-value="0.69" | 690 m || 
|-id=162 bgcolor=#fefefe
| 225162 ||  || — || April 9, 2008 || Kitt Peak || Spacewatch || — || align=right | 1.2 km || 
|-id=163 bgcolor=#E9E9E9
| 225163 ||  || — || April 10, 2008 || Kitt Peak || Spacewatch || MAR || align=right | 1.3 km || 
|-id=164 bgcolor=#E9E9E9
| 225164 ||  || — || April 9, 2008 || Kitt Peak || Spacewatch || — || align=right | 2.1 km || 
|-id=165 bgcolor=#fefefe
| 225165 ||  || — || April 11, 2008 || Mount Lemmon || Mount Lemmon Survey || — || align=right | 1.1 km || 
|-id=166 bgcolor=#fefefe
| 225166 ||  || — || April 11, 2008 || Kitt Peak || Spacewatch || MAS || align=right data-sort-value="0.98" | 980 m || 
|-id=167 bgcolor=#fefefe
| 225167 ||  || — || April 13, 2008 || Kitt Peak || Spacewatch || V || align=right data-sort-value="0.86" | 860 m || 
|-id=168 bgcolor=#fefefe
| 225168 ||  || — || April 3, 2008 || Kitt Peak || Spacewatch || V || align=right data-sort-value="0.55" | 550 m || 
|-id=169 bgcolor=#fefefe
| 225169 ||  || — || April 5, 2008 || Kitt Peak || Spacewatch || FLO || align=right data-sort-value="0.58" | 580 m || 
|-id=170 bgcolor=#fefefe
| 225170 ||  || — || April 14, 2008 || Kitt Peak || Spacewatch || — || align=right | 1.0 km || 
|-id=171 bgcolor=#fefefe
| 225171 ||  || — || April 24, 2008 || Kitt Peak || Spacewatch || — || align=right | 1.1 km || 
|-id=172 bgcolor=#fefefe
| 225172 ||  || — || April 25, 2008 || Kitt Peak || Spacewatch || H || align=right data-sort-value="0.70" | 700 m || 
|-id=173 bgcolor=#fefefe
| 225173 ||  || — || April 28, 2008 || La Sagra || OAM Obs. || NYS || align=right data-sort-value="0.88" | 880 m || 
|-id=174 bgcolor=#fefefe
| 225174 ||  || — || April 24, 2008 || Kitt Peak || Spacewatch || NYS || align=right data-sort-value="0.71" | 710 m || 
|-id=175 bgcolor=#E9E9E9
| 225175 ||  || — || April 24, 2008 || Kitt Peak || Spacewatch || — || align=right | 2.3 km || 
|-id=176 bgcolor=#fefefe
| 225176 ||  || — || April 26, 2008 || Mount Lemmon || Mount Lemmon Survey || — || align=right | 1.4 km || 
|-id=177 bgcolor=#fefefe
| 225177 ||  || — || April 29, 2008 || Mount Lemmon || Mount Lemmon Survey || — || align=right data-sort-value="0.74" | 740 m || 
|-id=178 bgcolor=#E9E9E9
| 225178 ||  || — || April 25, 2008 || Kitt Peak || Spacewatch || — || align=right | 3.0 km || 
|-id=179 bgcolor=#E9E9E9
| 225179 ||  || — || April 28, 2008 || Kitt Peak || Spacewatch || RAF || align=right | 1.4 km || 
|-id=180 bgcolor=#fefefe
| 225180 ||  || — || April 25, 2008 || Mount Lemmon || Mount Lemmon Survey || — || align=right | 1.2 km || 
|-id=181 bgcolor=#fefefe
| 225181 ||  || — || April 26, 2008 || Mount Lemmon || Mount Lemmon Survey || V || align=right data-sort-value="0.85" | 850 m || 
|-id=182 bgcolor=#fefefe
| 225182 ||  || — || April 28, 2008 || Kitt Peak || Spacewatch || FLO || align=right data-sort-value="0.91" | 910 m || 
|-id=183 bgcolor=#E9E9E9
| 225183 ||  || — || April 28, 2008 || Kitt Peak || Spacewatch || — || align=right | 2.3 km || 
|-id=184 bgcolor=#fefefe
| 225184 ||  || — || April 29, 2008 || Kitt Peak || Spacewatch || FLO || align=right data-sort-value="0.85" | 850 m || 
|-id=185 bgcolor=#d6d6d6
| 225185 ||  || — || April 29, 2008 || Kitt Peak || Spacewatch || — || align=right | 5.7 km || 
|-id=186 bgcolor=#fefefe
| 225186 ||  || — || April 30, 2008 || Kitt Peak || Spacewatch || NYS || align=right | 1.0 km || 
|-id=187 bgcolor=#d6d6d6
| 225187 ||  || — || April 28, 2008 || Mount Lemmon || Mount Lemmon Survey || — || align=right | 4.8 km || 
|-id=188 bgcolor=#d6d6d6
| 225188 ||  || — || April 30, 2008 || Kitt Peak || Spacewatch || — || align=right | 3.5 km || 
|-id=189 bgcolor=#E9E9E9
| 225189 ||  || — || April 30, 2008 || Kitt Peak || Spacewatch || — || align=right | 2.0 km || 
|-id=190 bgcolor=#fefefe
| 225190 ||  || — || April 29, 2008 || Mount Lemmon || Mount Lemmon Survey || FLO || align=right data-sort-value="0.77" | 770 m || 
|-id=191 bgcolor=#fefefe
| 225191 ||  || — || May 2, 2008 || Mount Lemmon || Mount Lemmon Survey || V || align=right data-sort-value="0.96" | 960 m || 
|-id=192 bgcolor=#E9E9E9
| 225192 ||  || — || May 1, 2008 || Catalina || CSS || — || align=right | 4.1 km || 
|-id=193 bgcolor=#fefefe
| 225193 ||  || — || May 3, 2008 || Kitt Peak || Spacewatch || — || align=right data-sort-value="0.81" | 810 m || 
|-id=194 bgcolor=#E9E9E9
| 225194 ||  || — || May 3, 2008 || Kitt Peak || Spacewatch || — || align=right | 2.1 km || 
|-id=195 bgcolor=#E9E9E9
| 225195 ||  || — || May 6, 2008 || Mount Lemmon || Mount Lemmon Survey || — || align=right | 1.8 km || 
|-id=196 bgcolor=#E9E9E9
| 225196 ||  || — || May 3, 2008 || Mount Lemmon || Mount Lemmon Survey || — || align=right | 2.5 km || 
|-id=197 bgcolor=#fefefe
| 225197 ||  || — || May 5, 2008 || Mount Lemmon || Mount Lemmon Survey || — || align=right | 1.3 km || 
|-id=198 bgcolor=#fefefe
| 225198 ||  || — || May 8, 2008 || Kitt Peak || Spacewatch || CIM || align=right | 3.0 km || 
|-id=199 bgcolor=#fefefe
| 225199 ||  || — || May 8, 2008 || Kitt Peak || Spacewatch || — || align=right | 1.0 km || 
|-id=200 bgcolor=#E9E9E9
| 225200 ||  || — || May 15, 2008 || Kitt Peak || Spacewatch || GEF || align=right | 1.4 km || 
|}

225201–225300 

|-bgcolor=#fefefe
| 225201 ||  || — || May 27, 2008 || Kitt Peak || Spacewatch || — || align=right | 1.2 km || 
|-id=202 bgcolor=#d6d6d6
| 225202 ||  || — || May 29, 2008 || Mount Lemmon || Mount Lemmon Survey || — || align=right | 3.4 km || 
|-id=203 bgcolor=#d6d6d6
| 225203 ||  || — || May 29, 2008 || Mount Lemmon || Mount Lemmon Survey || — || align=right | 3.3 km || 
|-id=204 bgcolor=#d6d6d6
| 225204 ||  || — || May 30, 2008 || Kitt Peak || Spacewatch || — || align=right | 5.0 km || 
|-id=205 bgcolor=#E9E9E9
| 225205 ||  || — || May 31, 2008 || Kitt Peak || Spacewatch || — || align=right | 2.1 km || 
|-id=206 bgcolor=#E9E9E9
| 225206 || 2008 LP || — || June 1, 2008 || Mount Lemmon || Mount Lemmon Survey || ADE || align=right | 2.3 km || 
|-id=207 bgcolor=#E9E9E9
| 225207 ||  || — || June 8, 2008 || Kitt Peak || Spacewatch || — || align=right | 2.3 km || 
|-id=208 bgcolor=#d6d6d6
| 225208 ||  || — || July 4, 2008 || Dauban || F. Kugel || TEL || align=right | 1.8 km || 
|-id=209 bgcolor=#C2FFFF
| 225209 ||  || — || July 29, 2008 || Kitt Peak || Spacewatch || L4 || align=right | 11 km || 
|-id=210 bgcolor=#C2FFFF
| 225210 ||  || — || August 30, 2008 || Socorro || LINEAR || L4 || align=right | 17 km || 
|-id=211 bgcolor=#C2FFFF
| 225211 ||  || — || August 23, 2008 || Kitt Peak || Spacewatch || L4 || align=right | 10 km || 
|-id=212 bgcolor=#C2FFFF
| 225212 ||  || — || September 3, 2008 || Goodricke-Pigott || R. A. Tucker || L4 || align=right | 12 km || 
|-id=213 bgcolor=#C2FFFF
| 225213 ||  || — || September 8, 2008 || Dauban || F. Kugel || L4 || align=right | 16 km || 
|-id=214 bgcolor=#C2FFFF
| 225214 ||  || — || September 3, 2008 || Kitt Peak || Spacewatch || L4ERY || align=right | 11 km || 
|-id=215 bgcolor=#C2FFFF
| 225215 ||  || — || September 4, 2008 || Kitt Peak || Spacewatch || L4 || align=right | 13 km || 
|-id=216 bgcolor=#C2FFFF
| 225216 ||  || — || September 6, 2008 || Catalina || CSS || L4 || align=right | 10 km || 
|-id=217 bgcolor=#C2FFFF
| 225217 ||  || — || September 4, 2008 || Kitt Peak || Spacewatch || L4 || align=right | 12 km || 
|-id=218 bgcolor=#C2FFFF
| 225218 ||  || — || September 7, 2008 || Mount Lemmon || Mount Lemmon Survey || L4 || align=right | 8.9 km || 
|-id=219 bgcolor=#C2FFFF
| 225219 ||  || — || September 4, 2008 || Kitt Peak || Spacewatch || L4 || align=right | 11 km || 
|-id=220 bgcolor=#C2FFFF
| 225220 ||  || — || September 5, 2008 || Kitt Peak || Spacewatch || L4 || align=right | 11 km || 
|-id=221 bgcolor=#C2FFFF
| 225221 ||  || — || September 19, 2008 || Kitt Peak || Spacewatch || L4 || align=right | 9.5 km || 
|-id=222 bgcolor=#C2FFFF
| 225222 ||  || — || September 20, 2008 || Kitt Peak || Spacewatch || L4ERY || align=right | 14 km || 
|-id=223 bgcolor=#C2FFFF
| 225223 ||  || — || September 20, 2008 || Mount Lemmon || Mount Lemmon Survey || L4 || align=right | 9.4 km || 
|-id=224 bgcolor=#C2FFFF
| 225224 ||  || — || September 20, 2008 || Catalina || CSS || L4 || align=right | 16 km || 
|-id=225 bgcolor=#d6d6d6
| 225225 Ninagrunewald ||  ||  || September 26, 2008 || Wildberg || R. Apitzsch || URS || align=right | 4.7 km || 
|-id=226 bgcolor=#C2FFFF
| 225226 ||  || — || September 29, 2008 || Mount Lemmon || Mount Lemmon Survey || L4 || align=right | 8.7 km || 
|-id=227 bgcolor=#C2FFFF
| 225227 ||  || — || October 2, 2008 || Catalina || CSS || L4ERY || align=right | 13 km || 
|-id=228 bgcolor=#C2FFFF
| 225228 ||  || — || October 4, 2008 || La Sagra || OAM Obs. || L4 || align=right | 16 km || 
|-id=229 bgcolor=#C2FFFF
| 225229 ||  || — || October 9, 2008 || Mount Lemmon || Mount Lemmon Survey || L4 || align=right | 10 km || 
|-id=230 bgcolor=#C2FFFF
| 225230 ||  || — || October 25, 2008 || Kachina || J. Hobart || L4 || align=right | 14 km || 
|-id=231 bgcolor=#fefefe
| 225231 ||  || — || April 18, 2009 || Piszkéstető || K. Sárneczky || — || align=right data-sort-value="0.95" | 950 m || 
|-id=232 bgcolor=#E9E9E9
| 225232 Kircheva ||  ||  || July 21, 2009 || Zvezdno Obshtestvo || F. Fratev || — || align=right | 1.1 km || 
|-id=233 bgcolor=#d6d6d6
| 225233 ||  || — || July 20, 2009 || La Sagra || OAM Obs. || — || align=right | 3.3 km || 
|-id=234 bgcolor=#fefefe
| 225234 ||  || — || August 12, 2009 || Socorro || LINEAR || FLO || align=right data-sort-value="0.97" | 970 m || 
|-id=235 bgcolor=#fefefe
| 225235 ||  || — || August 15, 2009 || Catalina || CSS || — || align=right data-sort-value="0.94" | 940 m || 
|-id=236 bgcolor=#E9E9E9
| 225236 ||  || — || August 15, 2009 || Kitt Peak || Spacewatch || — || align=right | 2.5 km || 
|-id=237 bgcolor=#E9E9E9
| 225237 ||  || — || August 15, 2009 || Kitt Peak || Spacewatch || — || align=right | 2.0 km || 
|-id=238 bgcolor=#fefefe
| 225238 Hristobotev ||  ||  || August 17, 2009 || Zvezdno Obshtestvo || F. Fratev || EUT || align=right data-sort-value="0.81" | 810 m || 
|-id=239 bgcolor=#E9E9E9
| 225239 Ruthproell ||  ||  || August 19, 2009 || Wildberg || R. Apitzsch || WIT || align=right | 1.3 km || 
|-id=240 bgcolor=#d6d6d6
| 225240 ||  || — || August 20, 2009 || Calvin-Rehoboth || L. A. Molnar || — || align=right | 4.5 km || 
|-id=241 bgcolor=#E9E9E9
| 225241 ||  || — || August 16, 2009 || Kitt Peak || Spacewatch || HOF || align=right | 3.2 km || 
|-id=242 bgcolor=#d6d6d6
| 225242 ||  || — || August 16, 2009 || Kitt Peak || Spacewatch || — || align=right | 2.8 km || 
|-id=243 bgcolor=#d6d6d6
| 225243 ||  || — || August 20, 2009 || La Sagra || OAM Obs. || VER || align=right | 4.6 km || 
|-id=244 bgcolor=#fefefe
| 225244 ||  || — || August 23, 2009 || Dauban || F. Kugel || NYS || align=right | 1.0 km || 
|-id=245 bgcolor=#E9E9E9
| 225245 ||  || — || August 19, 2009 || Kitt Peak || Spacewatch || — || align=right | 1.4 km || 
|-id=246 bgcolor=#E9E9E9
| 225246 ||  || — || August 23, 2009 || La Sagra || OAM Obs. || JUN || align=right | 1.2 km || 
|-id=247 bgcolor=#fefefe
| 225247 ||  || — || August 24, 2009 || Črni Vrh || Črni Vrh || V || align=right | 1.0 km || 
|-id=248 bgcolor=#d6d6d6
| 225248 ||  || — || August 24, 2009 || La Sagra || OAM Obs. || — || align=right | 5.7 km || 
|-id=249 bgcolor=#fefefe
| 225249 ||  || — || August 26, 2009 || Zvezdno Obshtestvo || Zvezdno Obshtestvo Obs. || — || align=right data-sort-value="0.73" | 730 m || 
|-id=250 bgcolor=#fefefe
| 225250 Georgfranziska ||  ||  || August 30, 2009 || Taunus || S. Karge, U. Zimmer || — || align=right | 2.2 km || 
|-id=251 bgcolor=#d6d6d6
| 225251 ||  || — || August 27, 2009 || Kitt Peak || Spacewatch || — || align=right | 3.2 km || 
|-id=252 bgcolor=#fefefe
| 225252 ||  || — || August 28, 2009 || La Sagra || OAM Obs. || — || align=right data-sort-value="0.94" | 940 m || 
|-id=253 bgcolor=#d6d6d6
| 225253 ||  || — || September 11, 2009 || La Sagra || OAM Obs. || EUP || align=right | 4.9 km || 
|-id=254 bgcolor=#fefefe
| 225254 Flury ||  ||  || September 10, 2009 || ESA OGS || M. Busch, R. Kresken || — || align=right | 1.6 km || 
|-id=255 bgcolor=#fefefe
| 225255 ||  || — || September 10, 2009 || Catalina || CSS || NYS || align=right data-sort-value="0.84" | 840 m || 
|-id=256 bgcolor=#fefefe
| 225256 ||  || — || September 12, 2009 || Socorro || LINEAR || FLO || align=right data-sort-value="0.84" | 840 m || 
|-id=257 bgcolor=#d6d6d6
| 225257 ||  || — || September 10, 2009 || Catalina || CSS || — || align=right | 4.8 km || 
|-id=258 bgcolor=#d6d6d6
| 225258 ||  || — || September 12, 2009 || Kitt Peak || Spacewatch || — || align=right | 2.8 km || 
|-id=259 bgcolor=#d6d6d6
| 225259 ||  || — || September 12, 2009 || Kitt Peak || Spacewatch || THM || align=right | 2.8 km || 
|-id=260 bgcolor=#d6d6d6
| 225260 ||  || — || September 12, 2009 || Kitt Peak || Spacewatch || — || align=right | 3.7 km || 
|-id=261 bgcolor=#d6d6d6
| 225261 ||  || — || September 15, 2009 || Kitt Peak || Spacewatch || — || align=right | 3.3 km || 
|-id=262 bgcolor=#fefefe
| 225262 ||  || — || September 12, 2009 || Kitt Peak || Spacewatch || NYS || align=right | 1.0 km || 
|-id=263 bgcolor=#E9E9E9
| 225263 ||  || — || September 14, 2009 || Kitt Peak || Spacewatch || HOF || align=right | 3.8 km || 
|-id=264 bgcolor=#d6d6d6
| 225264 ||  || — || September 14, 2009 || Kitt Peak || Spacewatch || — || align=right | 3.6 km || 
|-id=265 bgcolor=#fefefe
| 225265 ||  || — || September 15, 2009 || Kitt Peak || Spacewatch || V || align=right | 1.1 km || 
|-id=266 bgcolor=#fefefe
| 225266 ||  || — || September 15, 2009 || Kitt Peak || Spacewatch || NYS || align=right data-sort-value="0.96" | 960 m || 
|-id=267 bgcolor=#E9E9E9
| 225267 ||  || — || September 15, 2009 || Kitt Peak || Spacewatch || — || align=right | 2.1 km || 
|-id=268 bgcolor=#E9E9E9
| 225268 ||  || — || September 15, 2009 || Kitt Peak || Spacewatch || — || align=right | 3.4 km || 
|-id=269 bgcolor=#fefefe
| 225269 ||  || — || September 19, 2009 || Bisei SG Center || BATTeRS || — || align=right | 1.1 km || 
|-id=270 bgcolor=#fefefe
| 225270 ||  || — || September 16, 2009 || Kitt Peak || Spacewatch || — || align=right data-sort-value="0.85" | 850 m || 
|-id=271 bgcolor=#E9E9E9
| 225271 ||  || — || September 17, 2009 || Kitt Peak || Spacewatch || NEM || align=right | 2.9 km || 
|-id=272 bgcolor=#E9E9E9
| 225272 ||  || — || September 17, 2009 || Kitt Peak || Spacewatch || — || align=right | 2.2 km || 
|-id=273 bgcolor=#fefefe
| 225273 || 2128 P-L || — || September 26, 1960 || Palomar || PLS || NYS || align=right data-sort-value="0.90" | 900 m || 
|-id=274 bgcolor=#d6d6d6
| 225274 || 6781 P-L || — || September 24, 1960 || Palomar || PLS || HYG || align=right | 3.9 km || 
|-id=275 bgcolor=#E9E9E9
| 225275 || 6890 P-L || — || September 24, 1960 || Palomar || PLS || — || align=right | 1.9 km || 
|-id=276 bgcolor=#C2FFFF
| 225276 Leïtos || 1436 T-2 ||  || September 29, 1973 || Palomar || PLS || L4 || align=right | 11 km || 
|-id=277 bgcolor=#d6d6d6
| 225277 Stino ||  ||  || September 24, 1960 || Palomar || L. D. Schmadel, R. M. Stoss || CHA || align=right | 2.8 km || 
|-id=278 bgcolor=#E9E9E9
| 225278 ||  || — || February 28, 1981 || Palomar || S. J. Bus || — || align=right | 2.3 km || 
|-id=279 bgcolor=#E9E9E9
| 225279 ||  || — || November 5, 1991 || Kitt Peak || Spacewatch || — || align=right | 3.1 km || 
|-id=280 bgcolor=#fefefe
| 225280 ||  || — || March 17, 1993 || La Silla || UESAC || ERI || align=right | 2.0 km || 
|-id=281 bgcolor=#fefefe
| 225281 ||  || — || March 19, 1993 || La Silla || UESAC || NYS || align=right data-sort-value="0.95" | 950 m || 
|-id=282 bgcolor=#d6d6d6
| 225282 ||  || — || September 15, 1993 || La Silla || E. W. Elst || — || align=right | 2.6 km || 
|-id=283 bgcolor=#E9E9E9
| 225283 ||  || — || April 6, 1994 || Kitt Peak || Spacewatch || — || align=right | 2.9 km || 
|-id=284 bgcolor=#E9E9E9
| 225284 ||  || — || May 4, 1994 || Kitt Peak || Spacewatch || EUN || align=right | 1.6 km || 
|-id=285 bgcolor=#E9E9E9
| 225285 ||  || — || May 4, 1994 || Kitt Peak || Spacewatch || — || align=right | 1.9 km || 
|-id=286 bgcolor=#fefefe
| 225286 ||  || — || August 10, 1994 || La Silla || E. W. Elst || NYS || align=right data-sort-value="0.95" | 950 m || 
|-id=287 bgcolor=#fefefe
| 225287 ||  || — || September 12, 1994 || Kitt Peak || Spacewatch || NYS || align=right data-sort-value="0.65" | 650 m || 
|-id=288 bgcolor=#d6d6d6
| 225288 ||  || — || September 3, 1994 || La Silla || E. W. Elst || — || align=right | 4.0 km || 
|-id=289 bgcolor=#fefefe
| 225289 ||  || — || September 28, 1994 || Kitt Peak || Spacewatch || MAS || align=right | 1.2 km || 
|-id=290 bgcolor=#fefefe
| 225290 ||  || — || November 26, 1994 || Kitt Peak || Spacewatch || — || align=right | 1.4 km || 
|-id=291 bgcolor=#E9E9E9
| 225291 ||  || — || February 24, 1995 || Kitt Peak || Spacewatch || — || align=right | 1.2 km || 
|-id=292 bgcolor=#d6d6d6
| 225292 ||  || — || February 24, 1995 || Kitt Peak || Spacewatch || — || align=right | 2.8 km || 
|-id=293 bgcolor=#E9E9E9
| 225293 ||  || — || March 24, 1995 || Kitt Peak || Spacewatch || — || align=right | 1.8 km || 
|-id=294 bgcolor=#C2FFFF
| 225294 ||  || — || August 22, 1995 || Kitt Peak || Spacewatch || L4 || align=right | 11 km || 
|-id=295 bgcolor=#E9E9E9
| 225295 ||  || — || September 18, 1995 || Kitt Peak || Spacewatch || AEO || align=right | 2.0 km || 
|-id=296 bgcolor=#C2FFFF
| 225296 ||  || — || September 18, 1995 || Kitt Peak || Spacewatch || L4 || align=right | 10 km || 
|-id=297 bgcolor=#fefefe
| 225297 ||  || — || October 21, 1995 || Kitt Peak || Spacewatch || PHO || align=right | 1.2 km || 
|-id=298 bgcolor=#E9E9E9
| 225298 ||  || — || October 17, 1995 || Kitt Peak || Spacewatch || HOF || align=right | 3.7 km || 
|-id=299 bgcolor=#E9E9E9
| 225299 ||  || — || October 18, 1995 || Kitt Peak || Spacewatch || — || align=right | 2.5 km || 
|-id=300 bgcolor=#fefefe
| 225300 ||  || — || October 22, 1995 || Kitt Peak || Spacewatch || — || align=right data-sort-value="0.92" | 920 m || 
|}

225301–225400 

|-bgcolor=#E9E9E9
| 225301 ||  || — || November 14, 1995 || Kitt Peak || Spacewatch || — || align=right | 3.0 km || 
|-id=302 bgcolor=#E9E9E9
| 225302 ||  || — || November 15, 1995 || Kitt Peak || Spacewatch || DOR || align=right | 2.5 km || 
|-id=303 bgcolor=#fefefe
| 225303 ||  || — || November 15, 1995 || Kitt Peak || Spacewatch || FLO || align=right data-sort-value="0.97" | 970 m || 
|-id=304 bgcolor=#fefefe
| 225304 ||  || — || November 19, 1995 || Haleakala || AMOS || V || align=right data-sort-value="0.96" | 960 m || 
|-id=305 bgcolor=#fefefe
| 225305 ||  || — || December 14, 1995 || Kitt Peak || Spacewatch || — || align=right data-sort-value="0.91" | 910 m || 
|-id=306 bgcolor=#d6d6d6
| 225306 ||  || — || March 12, 1996 || Kitt Peak || Spacewatch || — || align=right | 3.7 km || 
|-id=307 bgcolor=#d6d6d6
| 225307 ||  || — || April 12, 1996 || Kitt Peak || Spacewatch || EOS || align=right | 2.8 km || 
|-id=308 bgcolor=#fefefe
| 225308 || 1996 HH || — || April 17, 1996 || Haleakala || AMOS || NYS || align=right data-sort-value="0.94" | 940 m || 
|-id=309 bgcolor=#d6d6d6
| 225309 ||  || — || April 17, 1996 || La Silla || E. W. Elst || — || align=right | 5.7 km || 
|-id=310 bgcolor=#E9E9E9
| 225310 ||  || — || October 7, 1996 || Kitt Peak || Spacewatch || — || align=right | 1.9 km || 
|-id=311 bgcolor=#E9E9E9
| 225311 ||  || — || November 6, 1996 || Kitt Peak || Spacewatch || — || align=right | 2.2 km || 
|-id=312 bgcolor=#FFC2E0
| 225312 ||  || — || December 12, 1996 || Kitt Peak || Spacewatch || AMOfast || align=right data-sort-value="0.16" | 160 m || 
|-id=313 bgcolor=#fefefe
| 225313 ||  || — || February 4, 1997 || Kitt Peak || Spacewatch || — || align=right | 1.6 km || 
|-id=314 bgcolor=#fefefe
| 225314 ||  || — || March 5, 1997 || Kitt Peak || Spacewatch || — || align=right data-sort-value="0.84" | 840 m || 
|-id=315 bgcolor=#fefefe
| 225315 ||  || — || June 2, 1997 || Kitt Peak || Spacewatch || — || align=right | 2.7 km || 
|-id=316 bgcolor=#d6d6d6
| 225316 ||  || — || June 8, 1997 || La Silla || E. W. Elst || — || align=right | 2.8 km || 
|-id=317 bgcolor=#fefefe
| 225317 ||  || — || September 28, 1997 || Kitt Peak || Spacewatch || NYS || align=right data-sort-value="0.93" | 930 m || 
|-id=318 bgcolor=#C2FFFF
| 225318 ||  || — || September 28, 1997 || Kitt Peak || Spacewatch || L4 || align=right | 12 km || 
|-id=319 bgcolor=#C2FFFF
| 225319 ||  || — || October 2, 1997 || Kitt Peak || Spacewatch || L4 || align=right | 8.0 km || 
|-id=320 bgcolor=#d6d6d6
| 225320 ||  || — || November 22, 1997 || Kitt Peak || Spacewatch || — || align=right | 4.7 km || 
|-id=321 bgcolor=#fefefe
| 225321 Stevenkoenig ||  ||  || December 6, 1997 || Caussols || ODAS || CIM || align=right | 3.7 km || 
|-id=322 bgcolor=#E9E9E9
| 225322 ||  || — || January 22, 1998 || Kitt Peak || Spacewatch || — || align=right | 2.1 km || 
|-id=323 bgcolor=#E9E9E9
| 225323 ||  || — || March 24, 1998 || Caussols || ODAS || — || align=right | 3.1 km || 
|-id=324 bgcolor=#E9E9E9
| 225324 ||  || — || March 31, 1998 || Socorro || LINEAR || — || align=right | 2.2 km || 
|-id=325 bgcolor=#E9E9E9
| 225325 ||  || — || April 21, 1998 || Socorro || LINEAR || — || align=right | 1.9 km || 
|-id=326 bgcolor=#E9E9E9
| 225326 ||  || — || April 29, 1998 || Haleakala || NEAT || — || align=right | 3.2 km || 
|-id=327 bgcolor=#E9E9E9
| 225327 ||  || — || May 23, 1998 || Socorro || LINEAR || — || align=right | 3.3 km || 
|-id=328 bgcolor=#fefefe
| 225328 ||  || — || June 19, 1998 || Kitt Peak || Spacewatch || — || align=right data-sort-value="0.91" | 910 m || 
|-id=329 bgcolor=#fefefe
| 225329 ||  || — || August 17, 1998 || Socorro || LINEAR || FLO || align=right | 1.1 km || 
|-id=330 bgcolor=#fefefe
| 225330 ||  || — || August 26, 1998 || Kitt Peak || Spacewatch || ERI || align=right | 2.6 km || 
|-id=331 bgcolor=#fefefe
| 225331 ||  || — || August 24, 1998 || Socorro || LINEAR || — || align=right | 1.1 km || 
|-id=332 bgcolor=#fefefe
| 225332 ||  || — || August 19, 1998 || Socorro || LINEAR || FLO || align=right | 1.0 km || 
|-id=333 bgcolor=#FA8072
| 225333 ||  || — || August 30, 1998 || Siding Spring || R. H. McNaught || — || align=right | 1.7 km || 
|-id=334 bgcolor=#fefefe
| 225334 ||  || — || September 14, 1998 || Socorro || LINEAR || V || align=right data-sort-value="0.88" | 880 m || 
|-id=335 bgcolor=#fefefe
| 225335 ||  || — || September 14, 1998 || Socorro || LINEAR || — || align=right | 1.2 km || 
|-id=336 bgcolor=#d6d6d6
| 225336 ||  || — || September 14, 1998 || Socorro || LINEAR || — || align=right | 4.1 km || 
|-id=337 bgcolor=#fefefe
| 225337 ||  || — || September 14, 1998 || Socorro || LINEAR || — || align=right | 1.4 km || 
|-id=338 bgcolor=#d6d6d6
| 225338 ||  || — || September 20, 1998 || Kitt Peak || Spacewatch || — || align=right | 3.7 km || 
|-id=339 bgcolor=#d6d6d6
| 225339 ||  || — || September 22, 1998 || Caussols || ODAS || — || align=right | 3.7 km || 
|-id=340 bgcolor=#fefefe
| 225340 ||  || — || September 18, 1998 || Kitt Peak || Spacewatch || ERI || align=right | 1.8 km || 
|-id=341 bgcolor=#fefefe
| 225341 ||  || — || September 27, 1998 || Kitt Peak || Spacewatch || — || align=right data-sort-value="0.81" | 810 m || 
|-id=342 bgcolor=#fefefe
| 225342 ||  || — || September 26, 1998 || Socorro || LINEAR || V || align=right | 1.1 km || 
|-id=343 bgcolor=#d6d6d6
| 225343 ||  || — || September 26, 1998 || Socorro || LINEAR || — || align=right | 3.1 km || 
|-id=344 bgcolor=#fefefe
| 225344 ||  || — || September 26, 1998 || Socorro || LINEAR || — || align=right | 1.1 km || 
|-id=345 bgcolor=#fefefe
| 225345 ||  || — || September 26, 1998 || Socorro || LINEAR || NYS || align=right data-sort-value="0.79" | 790 m || 
|-id=346 bgcolor=#d6d6d6
| 225346 ||  || — || September 26, 1998 || Socorro || LINEAR || — || align=right | 5.7 km || 
|-id=347 bgcolor=#fefefe
| 225347 ||  || — || September 26, 1998 || Socorro || LINEAR || — || align=right | 1.1 km || 
|-id=348 bgcolor=#d6d6d6
| 225348 ||  || — || September 24, 1998 || Anderson Mesa || LONEOS || HYG || align=right | 3.4 km || 
|-id=349 bgcolor=#fefefe
| 225349 ||  || — || October 12, 1998 || Kitt Peak || Spacewatch || — || align=right | 1.9 km || 
|-id=350 bgcolor=#d6d6d6
| 225350 ||  || — || October 12, 1998 || Kitt Peak || Spacewatch || — || align=right | 4.4 km || 
|-id=351 bgcolor=#d6d6d6
| 225351 ||  || — || October 13, 1998 || Kitt Peak || Spacewatch || EOS || align=right | 3.1 km || 
|-id=352 bgcolor=#d6d6d6
| 225352 ||  || — || October 20, 1998 || Caussols || ODAS || — || align=right | 2.7 km || 
|-id=353 bgcolor=#d6d6d6
| 225353 ||  || — || October 17, 1998 || Kitt Peak || Spacewatch || — || align=right | 4.3 km || 
|-id=354 bgcolor=#fefefe
| 225354 ||  || — || October 18, 1998 || Anderson Mesa || LONEOS || — || align=right | 2.8 km || 
|-id=355 bgcolor=#d6d6d6
| 225355 ||  || — || October 18, 1998 || Anderson Mesa || LONEOS || — || align=right | 3.6 km || 
|-id=356 bgcolor=#fefefe
| 225356 ||  || — || November 14, 1998 || Kitt Peak || Spacewatch || FLO || align=right | 1.0 km || 
|-id=357 bgcolor=#fefefe
| 225357 ||  || — || November 14, 1998 || Kitt Peak || Spacewatch || — || align=right | 1.0 km || 
|-id=358 bgcolor=#fefefe
| 225358 ||  || — || November 15, 1998 || Kitt Peak || Spacewatch || FLO || align=right data-sort-value="0.98" | 980 m || 
|-id=359 bgcolor=#C2FFFF
| 225359 ||  || — || November 18, 1998 || Kitt Peak || M. W. Buie || L4ERY || align=right | 9.6 km || 
|-id=360 bgcolor=#fefefe
| 225360 ||  || — || November 24, 1998 || Kitt Peak || Spacewatch || MAS || align=right data-sort-value="0.82" | 820 m || 
|-id=361 bgcolor=#fefefe
| 225361 ||  || — || December 7, 1998 || Caussols || ODAS || — || align=right | 1.0 km || 
|-id=362 bgcolor=#fefefe
| 225362 ||  || — || December 11, 1998 || Kitt Peak || Spacewatch || — || align=right | 2.7 km || 
|-id=363 bgcolor=#d6d6d6
| 225363 ||  || — || December 12, 1998 || Kitt Peak || Spacewatch || VER || align=right | 5.2 km || 
|-id=364 bgcolor=#fefefe
| 225364 ||  || — || January 19, 1999 || Kitt Peak || Spacewatch || — || align=right | 1.5 km || 
|-id=365 bgcolor=#d6d6d6
| 225365 ||  || — || February 12, 1999 || Socorro || LINEAR || — || align=right | 3.7 km || 
|-id=366 bgcolor=#d6d6d6
| 225366 ||  || — || February 10, 1999 || Socorro || LINEAR || — || align=right | 5.9 km || 
|-id=367 bgcolor=#fefefe
| 225367 ||  || — || February 8, 1999 || Kitt Peak || Spacewatch || MAS || align=right data-sort-value="0.93" | 930 m || 
|-id=368 bgcolor=#fefefe
| 225368 ||  || — || February 9, 1999 || Kitt Peak || Spacewatch || — || align=right | 1.7 km || 
|-id=369 bgcolor=#d6d6d6
| 225369 ||  || — || March 17, 1999 || Kitt Peak || Spacewatch || — || align=right | 4.3 km || 
|-id=370 bgcolor=#E9E9E9
| 225370 ||  || — || March 23, 1999 || Kitt Peak || Spacewatch || — || align=right | 1.0 km || 
|-id=371 bgcolor=#E9E9E9
| 225371 ||  || — || April 16, 1999 || Kitt Peak || Spacewatch || CLO || align=right | 3.2 km || 
|-id=372 bgcolor=#E9E9E9
| 225372 ||  || — || May 10, 1999 || Socorro || LINEAR || ADE || align=right | 4.0 km || 
|-id=373 bgcolor=#fefefe
| 225373 ||  || — || June 12, 1999 || Socorro || LINEAR || PHO || align=right | 1.3 km || 
|-id=374 bgcolor=#fefefe
| 225374 ||  || — || September 7, 1999 || Socorro || LINEAR || — || align=right | 2.8 km || 
|-id=375 bgcolor=#d6d6d6
| 225375 ||  || — || September 8, 1999 || Socorro || LINEAR || BRA || align=right | 2.2 km || 
|-id=376 bgcolor=#fefefe
| 225376 ||  || — || September 9, 1999 || Socorro || LINEAR || — || align=right | 1.2 km || 
|-id=377 bgcolor=#E9E9E9
| 225377 ||  || — || September 5, 1999 || Kitt Peak || Spacewatch || AGN || align=right | 1.8 km || 
|-id=378 bgcolor=#fefefe
| 225378 ||  || — || September 16, 1999 || Socorro || LINEAR || — || align=right | 1.2 km || 
|-id=379 bgcolor=#d6d6d6
| 225379 ||  || — || October 7, 1999 || Kitt Peak || Spacewatch || 628 || align=right | 2.4 km || 
|-id=380 bgcolor=#d6d6d6
| 225380 ||  || — || October 8, 1999 || Kitt Peak || Spacewatch || — || align=right | 2.7 km || 
|-id=381 bgcolor=#fefefe
| 225381 ||  || — || October 2, 1999 || Socorro || LINEAR || — || align=right data-sort-value="0.94" | 940 m || 
|-id=382 bgcolor=#d6d6d6
| 225382 ||  || — || October 4, 1999 || Socorro || LINEAR || — || align=right | 3.9 km || 
|-id=383 bgcolor=#d6d6d6
| 225383 ||  || — || October 9, 1999 || Socorro || LINEAR || KOR || align=right | 2.1 km || 
|-id=384 bgcolor=#fefefe
| 225384 ||  || — || October 9, 1999 || Socorro || LINEAR || FLO || align=right data-sort-value="0.69" | 690 m || 
|-id=385 bgcolor=#E9E9E9
| 225385 ||  || — || October 10, 1999 || Socorro || LINEAR || — || align=right | 3.6 km || 
|-id=386 bgcolor=#fefefe
| 225386 ||  || — || October 12, 1999 || Socorro || LINEAR || — || align=right data-sort-value="0.98" | 980 m || 
|-id=387 bgcolor=#d6d6d6
| 225387 ||  || — || October 30, 1999 || Kitt Peak || Spacewatch || KAR || align=right | 2.0 km || 
|-id=388 bgcolor=#fefefe
| 225388 ||  || — || October 30, 1999 || Kitt Peak || Spacewatch || — || align=right | 1.4 km || 
|-id=389 bgcolor=#fefefe
| 225389 ||  || — || October 31, 1999 || Kitt Peak || Spacewatch || — || align=right data-sort-value="0.93" | 930 m || 
|-id=390 bgcolor=#E9E9E9
| 225390 ||  || — || October 31, 1999 || Kitt Peak || Spacewatch || AGN || align=right | 1.6 km || 
|-id=391 bgcolor=#E9E9E9
| 225391 ||  || — || October 31, 1999 || Kitt Peak || Spacewatch || — || align=right | 2.6 km || 
|-id=392 bgcolor=#d6d6d6
| 225392 ||  || — || October 31, 1999 || Kitt Peak || Spacewatch || KAR || align=right | 1.4 km || 
|-id=393 bgcolor=#E9E9E9
| 225393 ||  || — || October 16, 1999 || Kitt Peak || Spacewatch || — || align=right | 4.6 km || 
|-id=394 bgcolor=#d6d6d6
| 225394 ||  || — || October 16, 1999 || Kitt Peak || Spacewatch || KOR || align=right | 1.7 km || 
|-id=395 bgcolor=#d6d6d6
| 225395 ||  || — || October 30, 1999 || Catalina || CSS || — || align=right | 4.8 km || 
|-id=396 bgcolor=#fefefe
| 225396 ||  || — || October 30, 1999 || Kitt Peak || Spacewatch || — || align=right data-sort-value="0.79" | 790 m || 
|-id=397 bgcolor=#E9E9E9
| 225397 ||  || — || November 3, 1999 || Socorro || LINEAR || MRX || align=right | 4.2 km || 
|-id=398 bgcolor=#fefefe
| 225398 ||  || — || November 4, 1999 || Kitt Peak || Spacewatch || FLO || align=right data-sort-value="0.83" | 830 m || 
|-id=399 bgcolor=#d6d6d6
| 225399 ||  || — || November 4, 1999 || Kitt Peak || Spacewatch || — || align=right | 3.1 km || 
|-id=400 bgcolor=#d6d6d6
| 225400 ||  || — || November 5, 1999 || Kitt Peak || Spacewatch || — || align=right | 2.9 km || 
|}

225401–225500 

|-bgcolor=#d6d6d6
| 225401 ||  || — || November 6, 1999 || Kitt Peak || Spacewatch || — || align=right | 3.1 km || 
|-id=402 bgcolor=#d6d6d6
| 225402 ||  || — || November 9, 1999 || Kitt Peak || Spacewatch || CHA || align=right | 2.4 km || 
|-id=403 bgcolor=#d6d6d6
| 225403 ||  || — || November 9, 1999 || Kitt Peak || Spacewatch || — || align=right | 3.2 km || 
|-id=404 bgcolor=#fefefe
| 225404 ||  || — || November 14, 1999 || Socorro || LINEAR || — || align=right | 1.5 km || 
|-id=405 bgcolor=#fefefe
| 225405 ||  || — || November 3, 1999 || Catalina || CSS || — || align=right | 1.2 km || 
|-id=406 bgcolor=#fefefe
| 225406 ||  || — || November 12, 1999 || Socorro || LINEAR || FLO || align=right data-sort-value="0.86" | 860 m || 
|-id=407 bgcolor=#d6d6d6
| 225407 ||  || — || November 29, 1999 || Kitt Peak || Spacewatch || — || align=right | 3.0 km || 
|-id=408 bgcolor=#fefefe
| 225408 ||  || — || December 4, 1999 || Catalina || CSS || FLO || align=right | 1.5 km || 
|-id=409 bgcolor=#d6d6d6
| 225409 ||  || — || December 6, 1999 || Socorro || LINEAR || — || align=right | 3.4 km || 
|-id=410 bgcolor=#fefefe
| 225410 ||  || — || December 7, 1999 || Socorro || LINEAR || FLO || align=right | 1.3 km || 
|-id=411 bgcolor=#fefefe
| 225411 ||  || — || December 13, 1999 || Socorro || LINEAR || — || align=right | 1.1 km || 
|-id=412 bgcolor=#fefefe
| 225412 ||  || — || December 15, 1999 || Kitt Peak || Spacewatch || — || align=right data-sort-value="0.93" | 930 m || 
|-id=413 bgcolor=#fefefe
| 225413 ||  || — || December 5, 1999 || Kitt Peak || Spacewatch || — || align=right data-sort-value="0.97" | 970 m || 
|-id=414 bgcolor=#fefefe
| 225414 ||  || — || December 4, 1999 || Kitt Peak || Spacewatch || FLO || align=right data-sort-value="0.87" | 870 m || 
|-id=415 bgcolor=#fefefe
| 225415 ||  || — || December 8, 1999 || Socorro || LINEAR || — || align=right | 1.0 km || 
|-id=416 bgcolor=#FFC2E0
| 225416 || 1999 YC || — || December 17, 1999 || Socorro || LINEAR || APO +1km || align=right | 1.7 km || 
|-id=417 bgcolor=#fefefe
| 225417 ||  || — || December 27, 1999 || Kitt Peak || Spacewatch || FLO || align=right data-sort-value="0.92" | 920 m || 
|-id=418 bgcolor=#fefefe
| 225418 ||  || — || January 4, 2000 || Socorro || LINEAR || — || align=right | 1.5 km || 
|-id=419 bgcolor=#d6d6d6
| 225419 ||  || — || January 5, 2000 || Socorro || LINEAR || — || align=right | 4.3 km || 
|-id=420 bgcolor=#d6d6d6
| 225420 ||  || — || January 5, 2000 || Socorro || LINEAR || — || align=right | 6.1 km || 
|-id=421 bgcolor=#fefefe
| 225421 ||  || — || January 3, 2000 || Socorro || LINEAR || — || align=right | 1.2 km || 
|-id=422 bgcolor=#d6d6d6
| 225422 ||  || — || January 7, 2000 || Socorro || LINEAR || — || align=right | 3.6 km || 
|-id=423 bgcolor=#d6d6d6
| 225423 ||  || — || January 3, 2000 || Kitt Peak || Spacewatch || — || align=right | 2.7 km || 
|-id=424 bgcolor=#d6d6d6
| 225424 ||  || — || January 4, 2000 || Kitt Peak || Spacewatch || — || align=right | 5.4 km || 
|-id=425 bgcolor=#fefefe
| 225425 ||  || — || January 8, 2000 || Kitt Peak || Spacewatch || FLO || align=right data-sort-value="0.70" | 700 m || 
|-id=426 bgcolor=#d6d6d6
| 225426 ||  || — || January 7, 2000 || Kitt Peak || Spacewatch || — || align=right | 3.0 km || 
|-id=427 bgcolor=#fefefe
| 225427 ||  || — || January 28, 2000 || Prescott || P. G. Comba || — || align=right | 1.2 km || 
|-id=428 bgcolor=#d6d6d6
| 225428 ||  || — || January 26, 2000 || Kitt Peak || Spacewatch || THM || align=right | 2.4 km || 
|-id=429 bgcolor=#d6d6d6
| 225429 ||  || — || January 30, 2000 || Socorro || LINEAR || — || align=right | 4.0 km || 
|-id=430 bgcolor=#d6d6d6
| 225430 || 2000 CG || — || February 1, 2000 || Prescott || P. G. Comba || — || align=right | 3.1 km || 
|-id=431 bgcolor=#fefefe
| 225431 ||  || — || February 2, 2000 || Socorro || LINEAR || FLO || align=right | 1.1 km || 
|-id=432 bgcolor=#d6d6d6
| 225432 ||  || — || February 2, 2000 || Socorro || LINEAR || — || align=right | 5.6 km || 
|-id=433 bgcolor=#d6d6d6
| 225433 ||  || — || February 2, 2000 || Socorro || LINEAR || — || align=right | 5.0 km || 
|-id=434 bgcolor=#fefefe
| 225434 ||  || — || February 6, 2000 || Needville || Needville Obs. || — || align=right data-sort-value="0.96" | 960 m || 
|-id=435 bgcolor=#d6d6d6
| 225435 ||  || — || February 1, 2000 || Kitt Peak || Spacewatch || — || align=right | 3.4 km || 
|-id=436 bgcolor=#d6d6d6
| 225436 ||  || — || February 8, 2000 || Kitt Peak || Spacewatch || THM || align=right | 2.6 km || 
|-id=437 bgcolor=#d6d6d6
| 225437 ||  || — || February 4, 2000 || Socorro || LINEAR || — || align=right | 4.5 km || 
|-id=438 bgcolor=#d6d6d6
| 225438 ||  || — || February 5, 2000 || Kitt Peak || M. W. Buie || THM || align=right | 3.3 km || 
|-id=439 bgcolor=#d6d6d6
| 225439 ||  || — || February 4, 2000 || Kitt Peak || Spacewatch || — || align=right | 4.3 km || 
|-id=440 bgcolor=#fefefe
| 225440 ||  || — || February 25, 2000 || Socorro || LINEAR || PHO || align=right | 1.2 km || 
|-id=441 bgcolor=#fefefe
| 225441 ||  || — || February 28, 2000 || Socorro || LINEAR || V || align=right data-sort-value="0.93" | 930 m || 
|-id=442 bgcolor=#fefefe
| 225442 ||  || — || February 28, 2000 || Višnjan Observatory || K. Korlević || — || align=right | 1.4 km || 
|-id=443 bgcolor=#d6d6d6
| 225443 ||  || — || February 29, 2000 || Socorro || LINEAR || — || align=right | 3.2 km || 
|-id=444 bgcolor=#d6d6d6
| 225444 ||  || — || February 29, 2000 || Socorro || LINEAR || EOS || align=right | 3.7 km || 
|-id=445 bgcolor=#fefefe
| 225445 ||  || — || February 29, 2000 || Socorro || LINEAR || NYS || align=right data-sort-value="0.83" | 830 m || 
|-id=446 bgcolor=#d6d6d6
| 225446 ||  || — || February 29, 2000 || Socorro || LINEAR || THM || align=right | 3.1 km || 
|-id=447 bgcolor=#fefefe
| 225447 ||  || — || February 29, 2000 || Socorro || LINEAR || — || align=right | 1.7 km || 
|-id=448 bgcolor=#d6d6d6
| 225448 ||  || — || February 29, 2000 || Socorro || LINEAR || HYG || align=right | 4.8 km || 
|-id=449 bgcolor=#d6d6d6
| 225449 ||  || — || February 29, 2000 || Socorro || LINEAR || THM || align=right | 5.3 km || 
|-id=450 bgcolor=#fefefe
| 225450 ||  || — || February 29, 2000 || Socorro || LINEAR || ERI || align=right | 3.0 km || 
|-id=451 bgcolor=#d6d6d6
| 225451 ||  || — || March 2, 2000 || Kitt Peak || Spacewatch || THM || align=right | 3.5 km || 
|-id=452 bgcolor=#fefefe
| 225452 ||  || — || March 3, 2000 || Socorro || LINEAR || — || align=right | 2.4 km || 
|-id=453 bgcolor=#d6d6d6
| 225453 ||  || — || March 4, 2000 || Socorro || LINEAR || — || align=right | 3.0 km || 
|-id=454 bgcolor=#FA8072
| 225454 ||  || — || March 4, 2000 || Socorro || LINEAR || PHO || align=right | 1.7 km || 
|-id=455 bgcolor=#fefefe
| 225455 ||  || — || March 3, 2000 || Kitt Peak || Spacewatch || MAS || align=right | 1.1 km || 
|-id=456 bgcolor=#d6d6d6
| 225456 ||  || — || March 4, 2000 || Kitt Peak || Spacewatch || — || align=right | 4.2 km || 
|-id=457 bgcolor=#d6d6d6
| 225457 ||  || — || March 3, 2000 || Socorro || LINEAR || — || align=right | 3.6 km || 
|-id=458 bgcolor=#d6d6d6
| 225458 ||  || — || March 3, 2000 || Socorro || LINEAR || — || align=right | 4.2 km || 
|-id=459 bgcolor=#fefefe
| 225459 ||  || — || March 9, 2000 || Socorro || LINEAR || — || align=right | 1.7 km || 
|-id=460 bgcolor=#d6d6d6
| 225460 ||  || — || March 4, 2000 || Kitt Peak || Spacewatch || — || align=right | 3.5 km || 
|-id=461 bgcolor=#fefefe
| 225461 ||  || — || March 8, 2000 || Kitt Peak || Spacewatch || — || align=right | 1.9 km || 
|-id=462 bgcolor=#d6d6d6
| 225462 ||  || — || March 5, 2000 || Socorro || LINEAR || — || align=right | 3.4 km || 
|-id=463 bgcolor=#fefefe
| 225463 ||  || — || March 10, 2000 || Socorro || LINEAR || MAS || align=right | 1.1 km || 
|-id=464 bgcolor=#d6d6d6
| 225464 ||  || — || March 5, 2000 || Socorro || LINEAR || — || align=right | 5.2 km || 
|-id=465 bgcolor=#fefefe
| 225465 ||  || — || March 3, 2000 || Catalina || CSS || — || align=right | 1.1 km || 
|-id=466 bgcolor=#d6d6d6
| 225466 ||  || — || March 4, 2000 || Socorro || LINEAR || — || align=right | 5.5 km || 
|-id=467 bgcolor=#d6d6d6
| 225467 ||  || — || March 4, 2000 || Socorro || LINEAR || TIR || align=right | 3.7 km || 
|-id=468 bgcolor=#fefefe
| 225468 ||  || — || March 3, 2000 || Kitt Peak || Spacewatch || NYS || align=right | 2.1 km || 
|-id=469 bgcolor=#d6d6d6
| 225469 ||  || — || March 28, 2000 || Socorro || LINEAR || — || align=right | 6.6 km || 
|-id=470 bgcolor=#fefefe
| 225470 ||  || — || March 29, 2000 || Socorro || LINEAR || — || align=right | 1.6 km || 
|-id=471 bgcolor=#fefefe
| 225471 ||  || — || March 29, 2000 || Socorro || LINEAR || — || align=right | 3.4 km || 
|-id=472 bgcolor=#fefefe
| 225472 ||  || — || March 29, 2000 || Socorro || LINEAR || MAS || align=right | 1.2 km || 
|-id=473 bgcolor=#fefefe
| 225473 ||  || — || March 29, 2000 || Socorro || LINEAR || — || align=right | 1.4 km || 
|-id=474 bgcolor=#d6d6d6
| 225474 ||  || — || March 29, 2000 || Socorro || LINEAR || — || align=right | 2.9 km || 
|-id=475 bgcolor=#fefefe
| 225475 ||  || — || April 5, 2000 || Socorro || LINEAR || MAS || align=right data-sort-value="0.96" | 960 m || 
|-id=476 bgcolor=#fefefe
| 225476 ||  || — || April 5, 2000 || Socorro || LINEAR || NYS || align=right | 1.1 km || 
|-id=477 bgcolor=#fefefe
| 225477 ||  || — || April 5, 2000 || Socorro || LINEAR || — || align=right | 1.2 km || 
|-id=478 bgcolor=#fefefe
| 225478 ||  || — || April 7, 2000 || Socorro || LINEAR || — || align=right | 3.5 km || 
|-id=479 bgcolor=#fefefe
| 225479 ||  || — || April 4, 2000 || Socorro || LINEAR || ERI || align=right | 2.5 km || 
|-id=480 bgcolor=#fefefe
| 225480 ||  || — || April 4, 2000 || Socorro || LINEAR || NYS || align=right | 1.1 km || 
|-id=481 bgcolor=#fefefe
| 225481 ||  || — || April 5, 2000 || Kitt Peak || Spacewatch || — || align=right | 1.3 km || 
|-id=482 bgcolor=#fefefe
| 225482 ||  || — || April 12, 2000 || Socorro || LINEAR || PHO || align=right | 2.5 km || 
|-id=483 bgcolor=#E9E9E9
| 225483 ||  || — || April 11, 2000 || Kitt Peak || Spacewatch || — || align=right | 1.4 km || 
|-id=484 bgcolor=#fefefe
| 225484 ||  || — || April 6, 2000 || Anderson Mesa || LONEOS || — || align=right | 1.1 km || 
|-id=485 bgcolor=#fefefe
| 225485 ||  || — || April 7, 2000 || Socorro || LINEAR || NYS || align=right | 1.1 km || 
|-id=486 bgcolor=#fefefe
| 225486 ||  || — || April 25, 2000 || Kitt Peak || Spacewatch || — || align=right | 2.9 km || 
|-id=487 bgcolor=#fefefe
| 225487 ||  || — || April 24, 2000 || Kitt Peak || Spacewatch || MAS || align=right | 1.1 km || 
|-id=488 bgcolor=#FA8072
| 225488 ||  || — || April 28, 2000 || Socorro || LINEAR || — || align=right data-sort-value="0.72" | 720 m || 
|-id=489 bgcolor=#fefefe
| 225489 ||  || — || April 24, 2000 || Anderson Mesa || LONEOS || H || align=right data-sort-value="0.73" | 730 m || 
|-id=490 bgcolor=#d6d6d6
| 225490 ||  || — || April 29, 2000 || Socorro || LINEAR || — || align=right | 4.5 km || 
|-id=491 bgcolor=#fefefe
| 225491 ||  || — || April 28, 2000 || Socorro || LINEAR || — || align=right | 3.5 km || 
|-id=492 bgcolor=#fefefe
| 225492 ||  || — || April 29, 2000 || Socorro || LINEAR || NYS || align=right | 1.0 km || 
|-id=493 bgcolor=#fefefe
| 225493 ||  || — || April 26, 2000 || Anderson Mesa || LONEOS || NYS || align=right data-sort-value="0.97" | 970 m || 
|-id=494 bgcolor=#fefefe
| 225494 ||  || — || April 29, 2000 || Socorro || LINEAR || MAS || align=right | 1.0 km || 
|-id=495 bgcolor=#fefefe
| 225495 ||  || — || April 25, 2000 || Kitt Peak || Spacewatch || V || align=right | 1.1 km || 
|-id=496 bgcolor=#fefefe
| 225496 ||  || — || May 27, 2000 || Socorro || LINEAR || PHO || align=right | 2.0 km || 
|-id=497 bgcolor=#fefefe
| 225497 ||  || — || May 25, 2000 || Kitt Peak || Spacewatch || — || align=right | 1.7 km || 
|-id=498 bgcolor=#E9E9E9
| 225498 ||  || — || May 27, 2000 || Socorro || LINEAR || MIT || align=right | 3.6 km || 
|-id=499 bgcolor=#FA8072
| 225499 ||  || — || June 7, 2000 || Socorro || LINEAR || H || align=right | 1.2 km || 
|-id=500 bgcolor=#E9E9E9
| 225500 ||  || — || June 5, 2000 || Kitt Peak || Spacewatch || — || align=right | 2.3 km || 
|}

225501–225600 

|-bgcolor=#E9E9E9
| 225501 ||  || — || July 5, 2000 || Anderson Mesa || LONEOS || MIS || align=right | 3.8 km || 
|-id=502 bgcolor=#E9E9E9
| 225502 ||  || — || July 30, 2000 || Socorro || LINEAR || RAF || align=right | 1.5 km || 
|-id=503 bgcolor=#E9E9E9
| 225503 ||  || — || August 1, 2000 || Socorro || LINEAR || RAF || align=right | 1.5 km || 
|-id=504 bgcolor=#E9E9E9
| 225504 ||  || — || August 24, 2000 || Socorro || LINEAR || — || align=right | 1.6 km || 
|-id=505 bgcolor=#E9E9E9
| 225505 ||  || — || August 24, 2000 || Socorro || LINEAR || — || align=right | 1.7 km || 
|-id=506 bgcolor=#E9E9E9
| 225506 ||  || — || August 26, 2000 || Socorro || LINEAR || — || align=right | 4.1 km || 
|-id=507 bgcolor=#E9E9E9
| 225507 ||  || — || August 24, 2000 || Socorro || LINEAR || — || align=right | 1.7 km || 
|-id=508 bgcolor=#E9E9E9
| 225508 ||  || — || August 25, 2000 || Socorro || LINEAR || — || align=right | 3.1 km || 
|-id=509 bgcolor=#E9E9E9
| 225509 ||  || — || August 28, 2000 || Socorro || LINEAR || EUN || align=right | 2.1 km || 
|-id=510 bgcolor=#E9E9E9
| 225510 ||  || — || August 29, 2000 || Socorro || LINEAR || — || align=right | 1.5 km || 
|-id=511 bgcolor=#E9E9E9
| 225511 ||  || — || August 29, 2000 || Socorro || LINEAR || — || align=right | 3.4 km || 
|-id=512 bgcolor=#E9E9E9
| 225512 ||  || — || August 25, 2000 || Socorro || LINEAR || — || align=right | 2.7 km || 
|-id=513 bgcolor=#E9E9E9
| 225513 ||  || — || August 24, 2000 || Socorro || LINEAR || ADE || align=right | 3.9 km || 
|-id=514 bgcolor=#E9E9E9
| 225514 ||  || — || August 31, 2000 || Socorro || LINEAR || — || align=right | 2.4 km || 
|-id=515 bgcolor=#E9E9E9
| 225515 ||  || — || August 31, 2000 || Socorro || LINEAR || — || align=right | 1.5 km || 
|-id=516 bgcolor=#E9E9E9
| 225516 ||  || — || August 31, 2000 || Socorro || LINEAR || — || align=right | 2.2 km || 
|-id=517 bgcolor=#E9E9E9
| 225517 ||  || — || August 31, 2000 || Socorro || LINEAR || — || align=right | 1.7 km || 
|-id=518 bgcolor=#E9E9E9
| 225518 ||  || — || August 31, 2000 || Socorro || LINEAR || — || align=right | 2.2 km || 
|-id=519 bgcolor=#E9E9E9
| 225519 ||  || — || August 31, 2000 || Socorro || LINEAR || — || align=right | 1.3 km || 
|-id=520 bgcolor=#E9E9E9
| 225520 ||  || — || August 21, 2000 || Anderson Mesa || LONEOS || — || align=right | 3.1 km || 
|-id=521 bgcolor=#E9E9E9
| 225521 ||  || — || August 21, 2000 || Anderson Mesa || LONEOS || — || align=right | 2.0 km || 
|-id=522 bgcolor=#E9E9E9
| 225522 ||  || — || September 1, 2000 || Socorro || LINEAR || — || align=right | 2.9 km || 
|-id=523 bgcolor=#E9E9E9
| 225523 ||  || — || September 1, 2000 || Socorro || LINEAR || — || align=right | 2.5 km || 
|-id=524 bgcolor=#E9E9E9
| 225524 ||  || — || September 1, 2000 || Socorro || LINEAR || — || align=right | 1.7 km || 
|-id=525 bgcolor=#E9E9E9
| 225525 ||  || — || September 1, 2000 || Socorro || LINEAR || RAF || align=right | 1.5 km || 
|-id=526 bgcolor=#E9E9E9
| 225526 ||  || — || September 4, 2000 || Socorro || LINEAR || — || align=right | 2.3 km || 
|-id=527 bgcolor=#E9E9E9
| 225527 ||  || — || September 1, 2000 || Socorro || LINEAR || — || align=right | 2.9 km || 
|-id=528 bgcolor=#E9E9E9
| 225528 ||  || — || September 3, 2000 || Socorro || LINEAR || — || align=right | 1.7 km || 
|-id=529 bgcolor=#E9E9E9
| 225529 ||  || — || September 4, 2000 || Haleakala || NEAT || — || align=right | 2.8 km || 
|-id=530 bgcolor=#E9E9E9
| 225530 ||  || — || September 5, 2000 || Anderson Mesa || LONEOS || — || align=right | 5.0 km || 
|-id=531 bgcolor=#E9E9E9
| 225531 ||  || — || September 18, 2000 || Socorro || LINEAR || BAR || align=right | 1.8 km || 
|-id=532 bgcolor=#E9E9E9
| 225532 ||  || — || September 22, 2000 || Socorro || LINEAR || — || align=right | 3.1 km || 
|-id=533 bgcolor=#E9E9E9
| 225533 ||  || — || September 23, 2000 || Socorro || LINEAR || EUN || align=right | 2.3 km || 
|-id=534 bgcolor=#E9E9E9
| 225534 ||  || — || September 23, 2000 || Socorro || LINEAR || slow || align=right | 2.6 km || 
|-id=535 bgcolor=#E9E9E9
| 225535 ||  || — || September 24, 2000 || Socorro || LINEAR || — || align=right | 3.5 km || 
|-id=536 bgcolor=#E9E9E9
| 225536 ||  || — || September 24, 2000 || Socorro || LINEAR || — || align=right | 2.2 km || 
|-id=537 bgcolor=#E9E9E9
| 225537 ||  || — || September 24, 2000 || Socorro || LINEAR || — || align=right | 2.4 km || 
|-id=538 bgcolor=#E9E9E9
| 225538 ||  || — || September 24, 2000 || Socorro || LINEAR || ADE || align=right | 2.9 km || 
|-id=539 bgcolor=#E9E9E9
| 225539 ||  || — || September 22, 2000 || Socorro || LINEAR || — || align=right | 1.9 km || 
|-id=540 bgcolor=#E9E9E9
| 225540 ||  || — || September 23, 2000 || Socorro || LINEAR || — || align=right | 1.3 km || 
|-id=541 bgcolor=#E9E9E9
| 225541 ||  || — || September 24, 2000 || Socorro || LINEAR || — || align=right | 1.9 km || 
|-id=542 bgcolor=#E9E9E9
| 225542 ||  || — || September 24, 2000 || Socorro || LINEAR || EUN || align=right | 2.0 km || 
|-id=543 bgcolor=#E9E9E9
| 225543 ||  || — || September 23, 2000 || Socorro || LINEAR || — || align=right | 2.3 km || 
|-id=544 bgcolor=#E9E9E9
| 225544 ||  || — || September 23, 2000 || Socorro || LINEAR || — || align=right | 2.4 km || 
|-id=545 bgcolor=#E9E9E9
| 225545 ||  || — || September 30, 2000 || Ondřejov || P. Pravec, P. Kušnirák || EUN || align=right | 1.8 km || 
|-id=546 bgcolor=#E9E9E9
| 225546 ||  || — || September 28, 2000 || Socorro || LINEAR || — || align=right | 2.9 km || 
|-id=547 bgcolor=#E9E9E9
| 225547 ||  || — || September 22, 2000 || Kitt Peak || Spacewatch || — || align=right | 2.4 km || 
|-id=548 bgcolor=#E9E9E9
| 225548 ||  || — || September 24, 2000 || Socorro || LINEAR || — || align=right | 2.5 km || 
|-id=549 bgcolor=#E9E9E9
| 225549 ||  || — || September 24, 2000 || Socorro || LINEAR || MIS || align=right | 3.0 km || 
|-id=550 bgcolor=#E9E9E9
| 225550 ||  || — || September 23, 2000 || Socorro || LINEAR || — || align=right | 2.0 km || 
|-id=551 bgcolor=#E9E9E9
| 225551 ||  || — || September 23, 2000 || Socorro || LINEAR || GEF || align=right | 1.8 km || 
|-id=552 bgcolor=#E9E9E9
| 225552 ||  || — || September 25, 2000 || Socorro || LINEAR || DOR || align=right | 3.0 km || 
|-id=553 bgcolor=#E9E9E9
| 225553 ||  || — || September 28, 2000 || Socorro || LINEAR || — || align=right | 3.9 km || 
|-id=554 bgcolor=#E9E9E9
| 225554 ||  || — || September 30, 2000 || Socorro || LINEAR || EUN || align=right | 2.3 km || 
|-id=555 bgcolor=#E9E9E9
| 225555 ||  || — || September 30, 2000 || Socorro || LINEAR || — || align=right | 1.8 km || 
|-id=556 bgcolor=#E9E9E9
| 225556 ||  || — || September 30, 2000 || Socorro || LINEAR || — || align=right | 3.0 km || 
|-id=557 bgcolor=#E9E9E9
| 225557 ||  || — || September 26, 2000 || Haleakala || NEAT || — || align=right | 3.4 km || 
|-id=558 bgcolor=#E9E9E9
| 225558 ||  || — || September 25, 2000 || Haleakala || NEAT || MAR || align=right | 1.8 km || 
|-id=559 bgcolor=#E9E9E9
| 225559 ||  || — || September 20, 2000 || Socorro || LINEAR || — || align=right | 2.5 km || 
|-id=560 bgcolor=#E9E9E9
| 225560 ||  || — || September 21, 2000 || Anderson Mesa || LONEOS || — || align=right | 2.7 km || 
|-id=561 bgcolor=#E9E9E9
| 225561 ||  || — || September 25, 2000 || Anderson Mesa || LONEOS || slow || align=right | 2.4 km || 
|-id=562 bgcolor=#E9E9E9
| 225562 || 2000 TJ || — || October 2, 2000 || OCA-Anza || M. Collins, A. Rudd || ADE || align=right | 3.1 km || 
|-id=563 bgcolor=#E9E9E9
| 225563 ||  || — || October 2, 2000 || Eskridge || G. Hug || — || align=right | 2.3 km || 
|-id=564 bgcolor=#E9E9E9
| 225564 ||  || — || October 1, 2000 || Socorro || LINEAR || WIT || align=right | 1.4 km || 
|-id=565 bgcolor=#E9E9E9
| 225565 ||  || — || October 1, 2000 || Socorro || LINEAR || — || align=right | 2.4 km || 
|-id=566 bgcolor=#E9E9E9
| 225566 ||  || — || October 1, 2000 || Socorro || LINEAR || GEF || align=right | 1.7 km || 
|-id=567 bgcolor=#E9E9E9
| 225567 ||  || — || October 1, 2000 || Socorro || LINEAR || ADE || align=right | 3.1 km || 
|-id=568 bgcolor=#E9E9E9
| 225568 ||  || — || October 1, 2000 || Socorro || LINEAR || JUN || align=right | 2.1 km || 
|-id=569 bgcolor=#E9E9E9
| 225569 ||  || — || October 2, 2000 || Anderson Mesa || LONEOS || JUN || align=right | 1.6 km || 
|-id=570 bgcolor=#E9E9E9
| 225570 ||  || — || October 3, 2000 || Socorro || LINEAR || — || align=right | 3.3 km || 
|-id=571 bgcolor=#E9E9E9
| 225571 ||  || — || October 23, 2000 || Kleť || Kleť Obs. || MAR || align=right | 1.6 km || 
|-id=572 bgcolor=#E9E9E9
| 225572 ||  || — || October 25, 2000 || Socorro || LINEAR || — || align=right | 2.7 km || 
|-id=573 bgcolor=#E9E9E9
| 225573 ||  || — || October 25, 2000 || Socorro || LINEAR || INO || align=right | 1.5 km || 
|-id=574 bgcolor=#E9E9E9
| 225574 ||  || — || October 25, 2000 || Socorro || LINEAR || — || align=right | 3.6 km || 
|-id=575 bgcolor=#E9E9E9
| 225575 ||  || — || October 25, 2000 || Socorro || LINEAR || MAR || align=right | 1.9 km || 
|-id=576 bgcolor=#E9E9E9
| 225576 ||  || — || October 24, 2000 || Socorro || LINEAR || — || align=right | 2.3 km || 
|-id=577 bgcolor=#E9E9E9
| 225577 ||  || — || October 25, 2000 || Socorro || LINEAR || — || align=right | 2.6 km || 
|-id=578 bgcolor=#E9E9E9
| 225578 ||  || — || October 25, 2000 || Socorro || LINEAR || — || align=right | 2.3 km || 
|-id=579 bgcolor=#E9E9E9
| 225579 ||  || — || October 25, 2000 || Socorro || LINEAR || — || align=right | 3.3 km || 
|-id=580 bgcolor=#E9E9E9
| 225580 ||  || — || November 1, 2000 || Socorro || LINEAR || — || align=right | 2.4 km || 
|-id=581 bgcolor=#E9E9E9
| 225581 ||  || — || November 3, 2000 || Socorro || LINEAR || MRX || align=right | 2.1 km || 
|-id=582 bgcolor=#E9E9E9
| 225582 ||  || — || November 3, 2000 || Socorro || LINEAR || — || align=right | 3.0 km || 
|-id=583 bgcolor=#E9E9E9
| 225583 ||  || — || November 20, 2000 || Socorro || LINEAR || — || align=right | 2.3 km || 
|-id=584 bgcolor=#E9E9E9
| 225584 ||  || — || November 20, 2000 || Socorro || LINEAR || — || align=right | 2.8 km || 
|-id=585 bgcolor=#E9E9E9
| 225585 ||  || — || November 21, 2000 || Socorro || LINEAR || — || align=right | 3.7 km || 
|-id=586 bgcolor=#FFC2E0
| 225586 ||  || — || November 27, 2000 || Socorro || LINEAR || APO || align=right data-sort-value="0.71" | 710 m || 
|-id=587 bgcolor=#E9E9E9
| 225587 ||  || — || November 20, 2000 || Socorro || LINEAR || — || align=right | 1.9 km || 
|-id=588 bgcolor=#E9E9E9
| 225588 ||  || — || November 20, 2000 || Socorro || LINEAR || — || align=right | 2.8 km || 
|-id=589 bgcolor=#E9E9E9
| 225589 ||  || — || November 21, 2000 || Socorro || LINEAR || — || align=right | 3.7 km || 
|-id=590 bgcolor=#E9E9E9
| 225590 ||  || — || November 21, 2000 || Socorro || LINEAR || DOR || align=right | 4.5 km || 
|-id=591 bgcolor=#E9E9E9
| 225591 ||  || — || November 26, 2000 || Socorro || LINEAR || — || align=right | 4.2 km || 
|-id=592 bgcolor=#E9E9E9
| 225592 ||  || — || November 20, 2000 || Socorro || LINEAR || — || align=right | 5.8 km || 
|-id=593 bgcolor=#E9E9E9
| 225593 ||  || — || November 19, 2000 || Socorro || LINEAR || — || align=right | 3.4 km || 
|-id=594 bgcolor=#E9E9E9
| 225594 ||  || — || November 20, 2000 || Socorro || LINEAR || — || align=right | 3.7 km || 
|-id=595 bgcolor=#E9E9E9
| 225595 ||  || — || November 30, 2000 || Socorro || LINEAR || — || align=right | 3.7 km || 
|-id=596 bgcolor=#E9E9E9
| 225596 ||  || — || December 1, 2000 || Socorro || LINEAR || — || align=right | 3.4 km || 
|-id=597 bgcolor=#E9E9E9
| 225597 ||  || — || December 1, 2000 || Socorro || LINEAR || — || align=right | 4.7 km || 
|-id=598 bgcolor=#E9E9E9
| 225598 ||  || — || December 4, 2000 || Socorro || LINEAR || — || align=right | 3.6 km || 
|-id=599 bgcolor=#E9E9E9
| 225599 ||  || — || December 4, 2000 || Socorro || LINEAR || — || align=right | 3.5 km || 
|-id=600 bgcolor=#E9E9E9
| 225600 ||  || — || December 19, 2000 || Kitt Peak || Spacewatch || — || align=right | 3.0 km || 
|}

225601–225700 

|-bgcolor=#E9E9E9
| 225601 ||  || — || December 29, 2000 || Bisei SG Center || BATTeRS || — || align=right | 3.0 km || 
|-id=602 bgcolor=#E9E9E9
| 225602 ||  || — || December 30, 2000 || Socorro || LINEAR || — || align=right | 2.8 km || 
|-id=603 bgcolor=#E9E9E9
| 225603 ||  || — || December 30, 2000 || Socorro || LINEAR || — || align=right | 3.5 km || 
|-id=604 bgcolor=#E9E9E9
| 225604 ||  || — || December 30, 2000 || Socorro || LINEAR || — || align=right | 3.3 km || 
|-id=605 bgcolor=#E9E9E9
| 225605 ||  || — || December 30, 2000 || Socorro || LINEAR || GEF || align=right | 2.1 km || 
|-id=606 bgcolor=#E9E9E9
| 225606 ||  || — || December 30, 2000 || Socorro || LINEAR || — || align=right | 2.2 km || 
|-id=607 bgcolor=#E9E9E9
| 225607 ||  || — || December 30, 2000 || Socorro || LINEAR || INO || align=right | 1.7 km || 
|-id=608 bgcolor=#E9E9E9
| 225608 ||  || — || December 30, 2000 || Socorro || LINEAR || — || align=right | 3.8 km || 
|-id=609 bgcolor=#E9E9E9
| 225609 ||  || — || December 30, 2000 || Socorro || LINEAR || — || align=right | 3.9 km || 
|-id=610 bgcolor=#E9E9E9
| 225610 ||  || — || December 30, 2000 || Socorro || LINEAR || — || align=right | 4.3 km || 
|-id=611 bgcolor=#E9E9E9
| 225611 ||  || — || December 30, 2000 || Socorro || LINEAR || GEF || align=right | 2.4 km || 
|-id=612 bgcolor=#E9E9E9
| 225612 ||  || — || December 30, 2000 || Socorro || LINEAR || — || align=right | 2.0 km || 
|-id=613 bgcolor=#E9E9E9
| 225613 ||  || — || December 30, 2000 || Socorro || LINEAR || — || align=right | 3.8 km || 
|-id=614 bgcolor=#E9E9E9
| 225614 ||  || — || December 19, 2000 || Anderson Mesa || LONEOS || GER || align=right | 2.7 km || 
|-id=615 bgcolor=#E9E9E9
| 225615 ||  || — || December 29, 2000 || Anderson Mesa || LONEOS || — || align=right | 1.6 km || 
|-id=616 bgcolor=#E9E9E9
| 225616 ||  || — || December 19, 2000 || Socorro || LINEAR || DOR || align=right | 3.0 km || 
|-id=617 bgcolor=#E9E9E9
| 225617 ||  || — || January 2, 2001 || Socorro || LINEAR || — || align=right | 3.6 km || 
|-id=618 bgcolor=#d6d6d6
| 225618 ||  || — || January 5, 2001 || Socorro || LINEAR || — || align=right | 8.6 km || 
|-id=619 bgcolor=#E9E9E9
| 225619 ||  || — || January 4, 2001 || Socorro || LINEAR || — || align=right | 4.3 km || 
|-id=620 bgcolor=#E9E9E9
| 225620 ||  || — || January 4, 2001 || Socorro || LINEAR || — || align=right | 2.3 km || 
|-id=621 bgcolor=#E9E9E9
| 225621 || 2001 BD || — || January 17, 2001 || Oizumi || T. Kobayashi || — || align=right | 4.1 km || 
|-id=622 bgcolor=#E9E9E9
| 225622 ||  || — || January 18, 2001 || Socorro || LINEAR || 526 || align=right | 4.1 km || 
|-id=623 bgcolor=#C2FFFF
| 225623 ||  || — || January 18, 2001 || Socorro || LINEAR || L4 || align=right | 18 km || 
|-id=624 bgcolor=#C2FFFF
| 225624 ||  || — || January 19, 2001 || Kitt Peak || Spacewatch || L4 || align=right | 13 km || 
|-id=625 bgcolor=#d6d6d6
| 225625 ||  || — || January 21, 2001 || Socorro || LINEAR || — || align=right | 3.0 km || 
|-id=626 bgcolor=#d6d6d6
| 225626 ||  || — || January 17, 2001 || Kitt Peak || Spacewatch || K-2 || align=right | 2.2 km || 
|-id=627 bgcolor=#E9E9E9
| 225627 ||  || — || January 20, 2001 || Haleakala || NEAT || — || align=right | 4.2 km || 
|-id=628 bgcolor=#E9E9E9
| 225628 ||  || — || February 1, 2001 || Socorro || LINEAR || — || align=right | 2.4 km || 
|-id=629 bgcolor=#E9E9E9
| 225629 ||  || — || February 16, 2001 || Socorro || LINEAR || — || align=right | 1.7 km || 
|-id=630 bgcolor=#d6d6d6
| 225630 ||  || — || February 21, 2001 || Kitt Peak || Spacewatch || — || align=right | 3.1 km || 
|-id=631 bgcolor=#fefefe
| 225631 ||  || — || March 15, 2001 || Oizumi || T. Kobayashi || — || align=right | 1.4 km || 
|-id=632 bgcolor=#C2FFFF
| 225632 ||  || — || March 15, 2001 || Anderson Mesa || LONEOS || L4 || align=right | 15 km || 
|-id=633 bgcolor=#d6d6d6
| 225633 ||  || — || March 19, 2001 || Anderson Mesa || LONEOS || — || align=right | 5.5 km || 
|-id=634 bgcolor=#fefefe
| 225634 ||  || — || March 18, 2001 || Socorro || LINEAR || — || align=right | 1.1 km || 
|-id=635 bgcolor=#d6d6d6
| 225635 ||  || — || March 19, 2001 || Socorro || LINEAR || — || align=right | 5.1 km || 
|-id=636 bgcolor=#d6d6d6
| 225636 ||  || — || March 19, 2001 || Socorro || LINEAR || EUP || align=right | 5.8 km || 
|-id=637 bgcolor=#E9E9E9
| 225637 ||  || — || March 19, 2001 || Socorro || LINEAR || — || align=right | 3.8 km || 
|-id=638 bgcolor=#d6d6d6
| 225638 ||  || — || March 19, 2001 || Socorro || LINEAR || — || align=right | 4.6 km || 
|-id=639 bgcolor=#fefefe
| 225639 ||  || — || March 19, 2001 || Socorro || LINEAR || — || align=right | 1.2 km || 
|-id=640 bgcolor=#d6d6d6
| 225640 ||  || — || March 26, 2001 || Kitt Peak || Spacewatch || KOR || align=right | 2.1 km || 
|-id=641 bgcolor=#fefefe
| 225641 ||  || — || March 27, 2001 || Kitt Peak || Spacewatch || — || align=right data-sort-value="0.90" | 900 m || 
|-id=642 bgcolor=#d6d6d6
| 225642 ||  || — || March 27, 2001 || Kitt Peak || Spacewatch || 7:4 || align=right | 4.2 km || 
|-id=643 bgcolor=#E9E9E9
| 225643 ||  || — || March 16, 2001 || Socorro || LINEAR || — || align=right | 2.5 km || 
|-id=644 bgcolor=#fefefe
| 225644 ||  || — || March 16, 2001 || Socorro || LINEAR || — || align=right | 1.0 km || 
|-id=645 bgcolor=#fefefe
| 225645 ||  || — || March 18, 2001 || Anderson Mesa || LONEOS || — || align=right | 1.4 km || 
|-id=646 bgcolor=#fefefe
| 225646 ||  || — || March 19, 2001 || Anderson Mesa || LONEOS || MAS || align=right | 1.1 km || 
|-id=647 bgcolor=#fefefe
| 225647 ||  || — || March 27, 2001 || Kitt Peak || Spacewatch || — || align=right data-sort-value="0.98" | 980 m || 
|-id=648 bgcolor=#fefefe
| 225648 ||  || — || March 23, 2001 || Anderson Mesa || LONEOS || — || align=right | 1.1 km || 
|-id=649 bgcolor=#d6d6d6
| 225649 ||  || — || March 29, 2001 || Kitt Peak || Spacewatch || — || align=right | 4.7 km || 
|-id=650 bgcolor=#d6d6d6
| 225650 ||  || — || March 24, 2001 || Anderson Mesa || LONEOS || — || align=right | 4.7 km || 
|-id=651 bgcolor=#d6d6d6
| 225651 ||  || — || March 24, 2001 || Anderson Mesa || LONEOS || — || align=right | 4.9 km || 
|-id=652 bgcolor=#d6d6d6
| 225652 ||  || — || March 24, 2001 || Anderson Mesa || LONEOS || — || align=right | 4.8 km || 
|-id=653 bgcolor=#fefefe
| 225653 ||  || — || March 19, 2001 || Socorro || LINEAR || FLO || align=right | 1.2 km || 
|-id=654 bgcolor=#d6d6d6
| 225654 ||  || — || March 18, 2001 || Anderson Mesa || LONEOS || — || align=right | 4.3 km || 
|-id=655 bgcolor=#fefefe
| 225655 ||  || — || April 27, 2001 || Socorro || LINEAR || — || align=right | 1.3 km || 
|-id=656 bgcolor=#d6d6d6
| 225656 ||  || — || April 27, 2001 || Socorro || LINEAR || — || align=right | 6.7 km || 
|-id=657 bgcolor=#fefefe
| 225657 ||  || — || May 15, 2001 || Kitt Peak || Spacewatch || ERI || align=right | 1.6 km || 
|-id=658 bgcolor=#fefefe
| 225658 ||  || — || May 22, 2001 || Socorro || LINEAR || V || align=right | 1.1 km || 
|-id=659 bgcolor=#fefefe
| 225659 ||  || — || May 24, 2001 || Socorro || LINEAR || — || align=right | 1.5 km || 
|-id=660 bgcolor=#d6d6d6
| 225660 ||  || — || May 18, 2001 || Socorro || LINEAR || — || align=right | 7.0 km || 
|-id=661 bgcolor=#fefefe
| 225661 ||  || — || May 24, 2001 || Anderson Mesa || LONEOS || — || align=right | 1.1 km || 
|-id=662 bgcolor=#d6d6d6
| 225662 ||  || — || May 26, 2001 || Kitt Peak || Spacewatch || — || align=right | 4.3 km || 
|-id=663 bgcolor=#fefefe
| 225663 ||  || — || June 13, 2001 || Haleakala || NEAT || FLO || align=right | 1.4 km || 
|-id=664 bgcolor=#fefefe
| 225664 ||  || — || June 21, 2001 || Socorro || LINEAR || — || align=right | 1.7 km || 
|-id=665 bgcolor=#fefefe
| 225665 ||  || — || July 14, 2001 || Palomar || NEAT || V || align=right | 1.1 km || 
|-id=666 bgcolor=#fefefe
| 225666 ||  || — || July 14, 2001 || Palomar || NEAT || NYS || align=right data-sort-value="0.80" | 800 m || 
|-id=667 bgcolor=#fefefe
| 225667 ||  || — || July 13, 2001 || Palomar || NEAT || — || align=right | 1.4 km || 
|-id=668 bgcolor=#E9E9E9
| 225668 ||  || — || July 17, 2001 || Anderson Mesa || LONEOS || — || align=right | 1.2 km || 
|-id=669 bgcolor=#fefefe
| 225669 ||  || — || July 20, 2001 || Palomar || NEAT || — || align=right | 1.4 km || 
|-id=670 bgcolor=#fefefe
| 225670 ||  || — || July 18, 2001 || Palomar || NEAT || — || align=right | 1.0 km || 
|-id=671 bgcolor=#fefefe
| 225671 ||  || — || July 21, 2001 || Palomar || NEAT || — || align=right | 3.1 km || 
|-id=672 bgcolor=#fefefe
| 225672 ||  || — || July 19, 2001 || Anderson Mesa || LONEOS || V || align=right | 1.2 km || 
|-id=673 bgcolor=#fefefe
| 225673 ||  || — || July 25, 2001 || Haleakala || NEAT || V || align=right | 1.1 km || 
|-id=674 bgcolor=#fefefe
| 225674 ||  || — || July 29, 2001 || Bergisch Gladbach || W. Bickel || NYS || align=right data-sort-value="0.87" | 870 m || 
|-id=675 bgcolor=#fefefe
| 225675 || 2001 PA || — || August 1, 2001 || Palomar || NEAT || — || align=right | 2.0 km || 
|-id=676 bgcolor=#fefefe
| 225676 ||  || — || August 9, 2001 || Palomar || NEAT || — || align=right | 1.1 km || 
|-id=677 bgcolor=#fefefe
| 225677 ||  || — || August 10, 2001 || Haleakala || NEAT || — || align=right | 1.1 km || 
|-id=678 bgcolor=#fefefe
| 225678 ||  || — || August 12, 2001 || Haleakala || NEAT || V || align=right | 1.1 km || 
|-id=679 bgcolor=#fefefe
| 225679 ||  || — || August 15, 2001 || Haleakala || NEAT || — || align=right | 1.2 km || 
|-id=680 bgcolor=#fefefe
| 225680 ||  || — || August 13, 2001 || Haleakala || NEAT || — || align=right data-sort-value="0.87" | 870 m || 
|-id=681 bgcolor=#fefefe
| 225681 ||  || — || August 13, 2001 || Haleakala || NEAT || — || align=right | 1.00 km || 
|-id=682 bgcolor=#fefefe
| 225682 ||  || — || August 15, 2001 || Haleakala || NEAT || NYS || align=right data-sort-value="0.81" | 810 m || 
|-id=683 bgcolor=#fefefe
| 225683 ||  || — || August 16, 2001 || Socorro || LINEAR || — || align=right | 1.4 km || 
|-id=684 bgcolor=#fefefe
| 225684 ||  || — || August 17, 2001 || Palomar || NEAT || — || align=right | 1.3 km || 
|-id=685 bgcolor=#fefefe
| 225685 ||  || — || August 16, 2001 || Socorro || LINEAR || — || align=right | 1.1 km || 
|-id=686 bgcolor=#fefefe
| 225686 ||  || — || August 18, 2001 || Socorro || LINEAR || — || align=right | 1.1 km || 
|-id=687 bgcolor=#fefefe
| 225687 ||  || — || August 20, 2001 || Terre Haute || C. Wolfe || — || align=right | 3.0 km || 
|-id=688 bgcolor=#fefefe
| 225688 ||  || — || August 22, 2001 || Kitt Peak || Spacewatch || NYS || align=right data-sort-value="0.84" | 840 m || 
|-id=689 bgcolor=#fefefe
| 225689 ||  || — || August 17, 2001 || Socorro || LINEAR || — || align=right | 3.5 km || 
|-id=690 bgcolor=#fefefe
| 225690 ||  || — || August 18, 2001 || Socorro || LINEAR || NYS || align=right | 1.6 km || 
|-id=691 bgcolor=#fefefe
| 225691 ||  || — || August 19, 2001 || Socorro || LINEAR || — || align=right | 1.2 km || 
|-id=692 bgcolor=#fefefe
| 225692 ||  || — || August 25, 2001 || Kitt Peak || Spacewatch || MAS || align=right | 1.0 km || 
|-id=693 bgcolor=#fefefe
| 225693 ||  || — || August 26, 2001 || Kitt Peak || Spacewatch || NYS || align=right data-sort-value="0.79" | 790 m || 
|-id=694 bgcolor=#fefefe
| 225694 ||  || — || August 23, 2001 || Anderson Mesa || LONEOS || — || align=right | 1.2 km || 
|-id=695 bgcolor=#fefefe
| 225695 ||  || — || August 23, 2001 || Anderson Mesa || LONEOS || CLA || align=right | 2.9 km || 
|-id=696 bgcolor=#fefefe
| 225696 ||  || — || August 22, 2001 || Socorro || LINEAR || — || align=right | 1.8 km || 
|-id=697 bgcolor=#fefefe
| 225697 ||  || — || August 23, 2001 || Socorro || LINEAR || — || align=right data-sort-value="0.90" | 900 m || 
|-id=698 bgcolor=#fefefe
| 225698 ||  || — || August 21, 2001 || Palomar || NEAT || H || align=right data-sort-value="0.83" | 830 m || 
|-id=699 bgcolor=#fefefe
| 225699 ||  || — || August 21, 2001 || Palomar || NEAT || H || align=right data-sort-value="0.85" | 850 m || 
|-id=700 bgcolor=#fefefe
| 225700 ||  || — || August 22, 2001 || Socorro || LINEAR || — || align=right | 3.4 km || 
|}

225701–225800 

|-bgcolor=#fefefe
| 225701 ||  || — || August 23, 2001 || Anderson Mesa || LONEOS || — || align=right | 1.3 km || 
|-id=702 bgcolor=#fefefe
| 225702 ||  || — || August 23, 2001 || Anderson Mesa || LONEOS || — || align=right | 1.4 km || 
|-id=703 bgcolor=#fefefe
| 225703 ||  || — || August 24, 2001 || Anderson Mesa || LONEOS || V || align=right | 1.1 km || 
|-id=704 bgcolor=#fefefe
| 225704 ||  || — || August 24, 2001 || Anderson Mesa || LONEOS || — || align=right | 1.1 km || 
|-id=705 bgcolor=#fefefe
| 225705 ||  || — || August 24, 2001 || Anderson Mesa || LONEOS || V || align=right data-sort-value="0.89" | 890 m || 
|-id=706 bgcolor=#E9E9E9
| 225706 ||  || — || August 24, 2001 || Socorro || LINEAR || — || align=right | 1.7 km || 
|-id=707 bgcolor=#fefefe
| 225707 ||  || — || August 24, 2001 || Socorro || LINEAR || — || align=right | 1.7 km || 
|-id=708 bgcolor=#fefefe
| 225708 ||  || — || August 24, 2001 || Socorro || LINEAR || NYSfast? || align=right | 1.1 km || 
|-id=709 bgcolor=#fefefe
| 225709 ||  || — || August 25, 2001 || Socorro || LINEAR || NYS || align=right data-sort-value="0.97" | 970 m || 
|-id=710 bgcolor=#fefefe
| 225710 ||  || — || August 19, 2001 || Socorro || LINEAR || — || align=right | 1.6 km || 
|-id=711 bgcolor=#fefefe
| 225711 Danyzy ||  ||  || August 17, 2001 || Pises || Pises Obs. || MAS || align=right data-sort-value="0.89" | 890 m || 
|-id=712 bgcolor=#E9E9E9
| 225712 ||  || — || September 7, 2001 || Socorro || LINEAR || — || align=right | 1.3 km || 
|-id=713 bgcolor=#fefefe
| 225713 ||  || — || September 8, 2001 || Socorro || LINEAR || H || align=right | 1.1 km || 
|-id=714 bgcolor=#fefefe
| 225714 ||  || — || September 7, 2001 || Socorro || LINEAR || NYS || align=right | 1.0 km || 
|-id=715 bgcolor=#fefefe
| 225715 ||  || — || September 7, 2001 || Socorro || LINEAR || NYS || align=right | 1.1 km || 
|-id=716 bgcolor=#fefefe
| 225716 ||  || — || September 7, 2001 || Socorro || LINEAR || MAS || align=right data-sort-value="0.92" | 920 m || 
|-id=717 bgcolor=#fefefe
| 225717 ||  || — || September 8, 2001 || Socorro || LINEAR || V || align=right | 1.0 km || 
|-id=718 bgcolor=#fefefe
| 225718 ||  || — || September 12, 2001 || Socorro || LINEAR || — || align=right | 1.2 km || 
|-id=719 bgcolor=#fefefe
| 225719 ||  || — || September 12, 2001 || Socorro || LINEAR || NYS || align=right | 1.7 km || 
|-id=720 bgcolor=#fefefe
| 225720 ||  || — || September 12, 2001 || Socorro || LINEAR || NYS || align=right data-sort-value="0.83" | 830 m || 
|-id=721 bgcolor=#fefefe
| 225721 ||  || — || September 11, 2001 || Anderson Mesa || LONEOS || — || align=right | 1.5 km || 
|-id=722 bgcolor=#fefefe
| 225722 ||  || — || September 11, 2001 || Anderson Mesa || LONEOS || NYS || align=right | 1.2 km || 
|-id=723 bgcolor=#fefefe
| 225723 ||  || — || September 11, 2001 || Anderson Mesa || LONEOS || — || align=right | 1.3 km || 
|-id=724 bgcolor=#fefefe
| 225724 ||  || — || September 12, 2001 || Kitt Peak || Spacewatch || — || align=right | 1.1 km || 
|-id=725 bgcolor=#fefefe
| 225725 ||  || — || September 12, 2001 || Socorro || LINEAR || NYS || align=right | 1.0 km || 
|-id=726 bgcolor=#fefefe
| 225726 ||  || — || September 12, 2001 || Socorro || LINEAR || NYS || align=right | 1.4 km || 
|-id=727 bgcolor=#fefefe
| 225727 ||  || — || September 12, 2001 || Socorro || LINEAR || MAS || align=right data-sort-value="0.94" | 940 m || 
|-id=728 bgcolor=#fefefe
| 225728 ||  || — || September 12, 2001 || Socorro || LINEAR || V || align=right | 1.2 km || 
|-id=729 bgcolor=#fefefe
| 225729 ||  || — || September 12, 2001 || Socorro || LINEAR || NYS || align=right data-sort-value="0.92" | 920 m || 
|-id=730 bgcolor=#fefefe
| 225730 ||  || — || September 12, 2001 || Socorro || LINEAR || NYS || align=right | 1.2 km || 
|-id=731 bgcolor=#fefefe
| 225731 ||  || — || September 12, 2001 || Socorro || LINEAR || MAS || align=right data-sort-value="0.89" | 890 m || 
|-id=732 bgcolor=#fefefe
| 225732 ||  || — || September 12, 2001 || Socorro || LINEAR || MAS || align=right | 1.2 km || 
|-id=733 bgcolor=#fefefe
| 225733 ||  || — || September 12, 2001 || Socorro || LINEAR || MAS || align=right data-sort-value="0.95" | 950 m || 
|-id=734 bgcolor=#fefefe
| 225734 ||  || — || September 12, 2001 || Socorro || LINEAR || — || align=right | 1.2 km || 
|-id=735 bgcolor=#fefefe
| 225735 ||  || — || September 11, 2001 || Anderson Mesa || LONEOS || NYS || align=right data-sort-value="0.78" | 780 m || 
|-id=736 bgcolor=#fefefe
| 225736 ||  || — || September 11, 2001 || Anderson Mesa || LONEOS || — || align=right | 1.2 km || 
|-id=737 bgcolor=#fefefe
| 225737 ||  || — || September 11, 2001 || Anderson Mesa || LONEOS || — || align=right | 1.3 km || 
|-id=738 bgcolor=#fefefe
| 225738 ||  || — || September 16, 2001 || Socorro || LINEAR || — || align=right | 1.2 km || 
|-id=739 bgcolor=#E9E9E9
| 225739 ||  || — || September 16, 2001 || Socorro || LINEAR || — || align=right | 1.1 km || 
|-id=740 bgcolor=#fefefe
| 225740 ||  || — || September 16, 2001 || Socorro || LINEAR || V || align=right | 1.0 km || 
|-id=741 bgcolor=#fefefe
| 225741 ||  || — || September 16, 2001 || Socorro || LINEAR || NYS || align=right data-sort-value="0.78" | 780 m || 
|-id=742 bgcolor=#fefefe
| 225742 ||  || — || September 16, 2001 || Socorro || LINEAR || NYS || align=right data-sort-value="0.85" | 850 m || 
|-id=743 bgcolor=#FA8072
| 225743 ||  || — || September 16, 2001 || Socorro || LINEAR || — || align=right | 1.8 km || 
|-id=744 bgcolor=#fefefe
| 225744 ||  || — || September 16, 2001 || Socorro || LINEAR || — || align=right | 1.2 km || 
|-id=745 bgcolor=#fefefe
| 225745 ||  || — || September 16, 2001 || Socorro || LINEAR || CHL || align=right | 2.9 km || 
|-id=746 bgcolor=#fefefe
| 225746 ||  || — || September 16, 2001 || Socorro || LINEAR || NYS || align=right | 1.1 km || 
|-id=747 bgcolor=#E9E9E9
| 225747 ||  || — || September 19, 2001 || Anderson Mesa || LONEOS || — || align=right | 1.4 km || 
|-id=748 bgcolor=#fefefe
| 225748 ||  || — || September 20, 2001 || Socorro || LINEAR || — || align=right | 1.2 km || 
|-id=749 bgcolor=#E9E9E9
| 225749 ||  || — || September 20, 2001 || Socorro || LINEAR || — || align=right | 1.8 km || 
|-id=750 bgcolor=#d6d6d6
| 225750 ||  || — || September 16, 2001 || Socorro || LINEAR || — || align=right | 5.6 km || 
|-id=751 bgcolor=#fefefe
| 225751 ||  || — || September 17, 2001 || Socorro || LINEAR || V || align=right | 1.2 km || 
|-id=752 bgcolor=#fefefe
| 225752 ||  || — || September 17, 2001 || Socorro || LINEAR || NYS || align=right data-sort-value="0.96" | 960 m || 
|-id=753 bgcolor=#fefefe
| 225753 ||  || — || September 17, 2001 || Socorro || LINEAR || — || align=right | 1.6 km || 
|-id=754 bgcolor=#fefefe
| 225754 ||  || — || September 17, 2001 || Socorro || LINEAR || — || align=right | 1.5 km || 
|-id=755 bgcolor=#fefefe
| 225755 ||  || — || September 17, 2001 || Socorro || LINEAR || — || align=right | 1.4 km || 
|-id=756 bgcolor=#fefefe
| 225756 ||  || — || September 17, 2001 || Socorro || LINEAR || NYS || align=right data-sort-value="0.86" | 860 m || 
|-id=757 bgcolor=#fefefe
| 225757 ||  || — || September 19, 2001 || Socorro || LINEAR || NYS || align=right data-sort-value="0.97" | 970 m || 
|-id=758 bgcolor=#fefefe
| 225758 ||  || — || September 19, 2001 || Socorro || LINEAR || MAS || align=right | 1.0 km || 
|-id=759 bgcolor=#fefefe
| 225759 ||  || — || September 16, 2001 || Socorro || LINEAR || MAS || align=right | 1.2 km || 
|-id=760 bgcolor=#fefefe
| 225760 ||  || — || September 19, 2001 || Socorro || LINEAR || NYS || align=right data-sort-value="0.89" | 890 m || 
|-id=761 bgcolor=#E9E9E9
| 225761 ||  || — || September 19, 2001 || Socorro || LINEAR || EUN || align=right | 1.7 km || 
|-id=762 bgcolor=#fefefe
| 225762 ||  || — || September 19, 2001 || Socorro || LINEAR || — || align=right | 1.1 km || 
|-id=763 bgcolor=#fefefe
| 225763 ||  || — || September 19, 2001 || Socorro || LINEAR || — || align=right | 1.7 km || 
|-id=764 bgcolor=#fefefe
| 225764 ||  || — || September 19, 2001 || Socorro || LINEAR || — || align=right | 1.2 km || 
|-id=765 bgcolor=#d6d6d6
| 225765 ||  || — || September 19, 2001 || Socorro || LINEAR || 3:2 || align=right | 5.2 km || 
|-id=766 bgcolor=#fefefe
| 225766 ||  || — || September 20, 2001 || Socorro || LINEAR || NYS || align=right data-sort-value="0.91" | 910 m || 
|-id=767 bgcolor=#fefefe
| 225767 ||  || — || September 20, 2001 || Kitt Peak || Spacewatch || MAS || align=right data-sort-value="0.95" | 950 m || 
|-id=768 bgcolor=#fefefe
| 225768 ||  || — || September 25, 2001 || Goodricke-Pigott || R. A. Tucker || — || align=right | 2.0 km || 
|-id=769 bgcolor=#fefefe
| 225769 ||  || — || September 20, 2001 || Socorro || LINEAR || V || align=right | 1.2 km || 
|-id=770 bgcolor=#fefefe
| 225770 ||  || — || September 19, 2001 || Socorro || LINEAR || NYS || align=right | 1.0 km || 
|-id=771 bgcolor=#fefefe
| 225771 ||  || — || September 18, 2001 || Anderson Mesa || LONEOS || — || align=right | 1.1 km || 
|-id=772 bgcolor=#fefefe
| 225772 ||  || — || October 10, 2001 || Palomar || NEAT || — || align=right | 1.5 km || 
|-id=773 bgcolor=#E9E9E9
| 225773 ||  || — || October 11, 2001 || Socorro || LINEAR || — || align=right | 1.6 km || 
|-id=774 bgcolor=#E9E9E9
| 225774 ||  || — || October 9, 2001 || Socorro || LINEAR || — || align=right | 3.8 km || 
|-id=775 bgcolor=#fefefe
| 225775 ||  || — || October 15, 2001 || Socorro || LINEAR || H || align=right data-sort-value="0.94" | 940 m || 
|-id=776 bgcolor=#E9E9E9
| 225776 ||  || — || October 14, 2001 || Socorro || LINEAR || — || align=right | 1.3 km || 
|-id=777 bgcolor=#fefefe
| 225777 ||  || — || October 10, 2001 || Palomar || NEAT || V || align=right data-sort-value="0.94" | 940 m || 
|-id=778 bgcolor=#fefefe
| 225778 ||  || — || October 10, 2001 || Palomar || NEAT || — || align=right | 1.2 km || 
|-id=779 bgcolor=#fefefe
| 225779 ||  || — || October 10, 2001 || Palomar || NEAT || — || align=right | 1.4 km || 
|-id=780 bgcolor=#fefefe
| 225780 ||  || — || October 15, 2001 || Palomar || NEAT || V || align=right | 1.3 km || 
|-id=781 bgcolor=#fefefe
| 225781 ||  || — || October 14, 2001 || Kitt Peak || Spacewatch || — || align=right data-sort-value="0.82" | 820 m || 
|-id=782 bgcolor=#fefefe
| 225782 ||  || — || October 11, 2001 || Palomar || NEAT || NYS || align=right data-sort-value="0.90" | 900 m || 
|-id=783 bgcolor=#fefefe
| 225783 ||  || — || October 14, 2001 || Socorro || LINEAR || — || align=right | 1.5 km || 
|-id=784 bgcolor=#fefefe
| 225784 ||  || — || October 14, 2001 || Socorro || LINEAR || — || align=right | 1.5 km || 
|-id=785 bgcolor=#E9E9E9
| 225785 ||  || — || October 11, 2001 || Socorro || LINEAR || — || align=right | 1.4 km || 
|-id=786 bgcolor=#fefefe
| 225786 ||  || — || October 17, 2001 || Socorro || LINEAR || — || align=right | 1.2 km || 
|-id=787 bgcolor=#fefefe
| 225787 ||  || — || October 17, 2001 || Socorro || LINEAR || — || align=right | 1.2 km || 
|-id=788 bgcolor=#fefefe
| 225788 ||  || — || October 17, 2001 || Socorro || LINEAR || NYS || align=right | 1.0 km || 
|-id=789 bgcolor=#E9E9E9
| 225789 ||  || — || October 20, 2001 || Socorro || LINEAR || — || align=right | 2.2 km || 
|-id=790 bgcolor=#E9E9E9
| 225790 ||  || — || October 21, 2001 || Socorro || LINEAR || — || align=right | 2.1 km || 
|-id=791 bgcolor=#E9E9E9
| 225791 ||  || — || October 23, 2001 || Socorro || LINEAR || — || align=right | 1.0 km || 
|-id=792 bgcolor=#fefefe
| 225792 ||  || — || October 17, 2001 || Palomar || NEAT || — || align=right | 1.2 km || 
|-id=793 bgcolor=#E9E9E9
| 225793 ||  || — || October 21, 2001 || Kitt Peak || Spacewatch || — || align=right | 1.1 km || 
|-id=794 bgcolor=#E9E9E9
| 225794 ||  || — || November 9, 2001 || Socorro || LINEAR || — || align=right | 1.0 km || 
|-id=795 bgcolor=#E9E9E9
| 225795 ||  || — || November 9, 2001 || Socorro || LINEAR || — || align=right | 1.4 km || 
|-id=796 bgcolor=#fefefe
| 225796 ||  || — || November 9, 2001 || Socorro || LINEAR || SVE || align=right | 4.9 km || 
|-id=797 bgcolor=#E9E9E9
| 225797 ||  || — || November 9, 2001 || Socorro || LINEAR || — || align=right | 2.1 km || 
|-id=798 bgcolor=#E9E9E9
| 225798 ||  || — || November 9, 2001 || Socorro || LINEAR || — || align=right | 1.8 km || 
|-id=799 bgcolor=#E9E9E9
| 225799 ||  || — || November 9, 2001 || Socorro || LINEAR || — || align=right | 1.3 km || 
|-id=800 bgcolor=#d6d6d6
| 225800 ||  || — || November 9, 2001 || Socorro || LINEAR || 3:2 || align=right | 4.0 km || 
|}

225801–225900 

|-bgcolor=#E9E9E9
| 225801 ||  || — || November 10, 2001 || Socorro || LINEAR || — || align=right data-sort-value="0.86" | 860 m || 
|-id=802 bgcolor=#E9E9E9
| 225802 ||  || — || November 11, 2001 || Socorro || LINEAR || — || align=right | 1.5 km || 
|-id=803 bgcolor=#fefefe
| 225803 ||  || — || November 11, 2001 || Kitt Peak || Spacewatch || SUL || align=right | 3.8 km || 
|-id=804 bgcolor=#fefefe
| 225804 ||  || — || November 10, 2001 || Socorro || LINEAR || — || align=right | 2.2 km || 
|-id=805 bgcolor=#fefefe
| 225805 ||  || — || November 15, 2001 || Socorro || LINEAR || H || align=right data-sort-value="0.83" | 830 m || 
|-id=806 bgcolor=#E9E9E9
| 225806 ||  || — || November 9, 2001 || Bergisch Gladbach || W. Bickel || — || align=right | 1.8 km || 
|-id=807 bgcolor=#fefefe
| 225807 ||  || — || November 11, 2001 || Socorro || LINEAR || H || align=right | 1.3 km || 
|-id=808 bgcolor=#E9E9E9
| 225808 ||  || — || November 15, 2001 || Socorro || LINEAR || — || align=right | 2.1 km || 
|-id=809 bgcolor=#E9E9E9
| 225809 ||  || — || November 12, 2001 || Socorro || LINEAR || — || align=right | 1.5 km || 
|-id=810 bgcolor=#E9E9E9
| 225810 ||  || — || November 12, 2001 || Socorro || LINEAR || — || align=right | 1.4 km || 
|-id=811 bgcolor=#fefefe
| 225811 ||  || — || November 12, 2001 || Socorro || LINEAR || — || align=right | 1.3 km || 
|-id=812 bgcolor=#E9E9E9
| 225812 ||  || — || November 12, 2001 || Socorro || LINEAR || — || align=right | 1.6 km || 
|-id=813 bgcolor=#fefefe
| 225813 ||  || — || November 12, 2001 || Socorro || LINEAR || H || align=right | 1.1 km || 
|-id=814 bgcolor=#fefefe
| 225814 ||  || — || November 17, 2001 || Socorro || LINEAR || H || align=right | 1.2 km || 
|-id=815 bgcolor=#E9E9E9
| 225815 ||  || — || November 17, 2001 || Socorro || LINEAR || — || align=right | 2.1 km || 
|-id=816 bgcolor=#E9E9E9
| 225816 ||  || — || November 17, 2001 || Socorro || LINEAR || — || align=right | 1.5 km || 
|-id=817 bgcolor=#E9E9E9
| 225817 ||  || — || November 17, 2001 || Socorro || LINEAR || — || align=right | 1.1 km || 
|-id=818 bgcolor=#E9E9E9
| 225818 ||  || — || November 19, 2001 || Socorro || LINEAR || — || align=right | 1.6 km || 
|-id=819 bgcolor=#E9E9E9
| 225819 ||  || — || November 20, 2001 || Socorro || LINEAR || — || align=right | 1.3 km || 
|-id=820 bgcolor=#E9E9E9
| 225820 ||  || — || November 19, 2001 || Socorro || LINEAR || KRM || align=right | 3.6 km || 
|-id=821 bgcolor=#E9E9E9
| 225821 ||  || — || November 18, 2001 || Socorro || LINEAR || MIT || align=right | 3.8 km || 
|-id=822 bgcolor=#E9E9E9
| 225822 || 2001 XL || — || December 4, 2001 || Socorro || LINEAR || — || align=right | 2.3 km || 
|-id=823 bgcolor=#E9E9E9
| 225823 ||  || — || December 9, 2001 || Socorro || LINEAR || BAR || align=right | 3.4 km || 
|-id=824 bgcolor=#fefefe
| 225824 ||  || — || December 9, 2001 || Socorro || LINEAR || H || align=right | 1.1 km || 
|-id=825 bgcolor=#E9E9E9
| 225825 ||  || — || December 10, 2001 || Socorro || LINEAR || — || align=right | 1.8 km || 
|-id=826 bgcolor=#E9E9E9
| 225826 ||  || — || December 10, 2001 || Socorro || LINEAR || — || align=right | 2.1 km || 
|-id=827 bgcolor=#E9E9E9
| 225827 ||  || — || December 9, 2001 || Socorro || LINEAR || EUN || align=right | 1.8 km || 
|-id=828 bgcolor=#E9E9E9
| 225828 ||  || — || December 9, 2001 || Socorro || LINEAR || — || align=right | 1.8 km || 
|-id=829 bgcolor=#E9E9E9
| 225829 ||  || — || December 9, 2001 || Socorro || LINEAR || ADE || align=right | 2.9 km || 
|-id=830 bgcolor=#fefefe
| 225830 ||  || — || December 10, 2001 || Socorro || LINEAR || NYS || align=right | 1.3 km || 
|-id=831 bgcolor=#E9E9E9
| 225831 ||  || — || December 10, 2001 || Socorro || LINEAR || — || align=right | 1.7 km || 
|-id=832 bgcolor=#E9E9E9
| 225832 ||  || — || December 10, 2001 || Socorro || LINEAR || — || align=right | 3.8 km || 
|-id=833 bgcolor=#fefefe
| 225833 ||  || — || December 11, 2001 || Socorro || LINEAR || H || align=right | 1.0 km || 
|-id=834 bgcolor=#E9E9E9
| 225834 ||  || — || December 11, 2001 || Socorro || LINEAR || — || align=right | 1.7 km || 
|-id=835 bgcolor=#E9E9E9
| 225835 ||  || — || December 11, 2001 || Socorro || LINEAR || — || align=right | 2.2 km || 
|-id=836 bgcolor=#E9E9E9
| 225836 ||  || — || December 13, 2001 || Socorro || LINEAR || EUN || align=right | 2.1 km || 
|-id=837 bgcolor=#E9E9E9
| 225837 ||  || — || December 10, 2001 || Socorro || LINEAR || — || align=right data-sort-value="0.97" | 970 m || 
|-id=838 bgcolor=#fefefe
| 225838 ||  || — || December 10, 2001 || Socorro || LINEAR || — || align=right | 1.6 km || 
|-id=839 bgcolor=#E9E9E9
| 225839 ||  || — || December 10, 2001 || Socorro || LINEAR || — || align=right | 2.0 km || 
|-id=840 bgcolor=#fefefe
| 225840 ||  || — || December 14, 2001 || Socorro || LINEAR || H || align=right data-sort-value="0.89" | 890 m || 
|-id=841 bgcolor=#E9E9E9
| 225841 ||  || — || December 10, 2001 || Socorro || LINEAR || — || align=right | 3.5 km || 
|-id=842 bgcolor=#E9E9E9
| 225842 ||  || — || December 13, 2001 || Socorro || LINEAR || — || align=right | 1.9 km || 
|-id=843 bgcolor=#E9E9E9
| 225843 ||  || — || December 14, 2001 || Socorro || LINEAR || — || align=right | 1.1 km || 
|-id=844 bgcolor=#E9E9E9
| 225844 ||  || — || December 14, 2001 || Socorro || LINEAR || — || align=right | 1.4 km || 
|-id=845 bgcolor=#E9E9E9
| 225845 ||  || — || December 14, 2001 || Socorro || LINEAR || — || align=right | 1.4 km || 
|-id=846 bgcolor=#E9E9E9
| 225846 ||  || — || December 14, 2001 || Socorro || LINEAR || — || align=right | 2.1 km || 
|-id=847 bgcolor=#E9E9E9
| 225847 ||  || — || December 14, 2001 || Socorro || LINEAR || — || align=right | 1.1 km || 
|-id=848 bgcolor=#E9E9E9
| 225848 ||  || — || December 14, 2001 || Socorro || LINEAR || — || align=right | 2.3 km || 
|-id=849 bgcolor=#E9E9E9
| 225849 ||  || — || December 14, 2001 || Socorro || LINEAR || MIT || align=right | 4.4 km || 
|-id=850 bgcolor=#fefefe
| 225850 ||  || — || December 14, 2001 || Socorro || LINEAR || — || align=right | 1.5 km || 
|-id=851 bgcolor=#E9E9E9
| 225851 ||  || — || December 14, 2001 || Socorro || LINEAR || — || align=right | 1.8 km || 
|-id=852 bgcolor=#E9E9E9
| 225852 ||  || — || December 14, 2001 || Socorro || LINEAR || — || align=right | 3.6 km || 
|-id=853 bgcolor=#E9E9E9
| 225853 ||  || — || December 14, 2001 || Socorro || LINEAR || — || align=right | 1.3 km || 
|-id=854 bgcolor=#E9E9E9
| 225854 ||  || — || December 14, 2001 || Socorro || LINEAR || — || align=right | 1.5 km || 
|-id=855 bgcolor=#E9E9E9
| 225855 ||  || — || December 14, 2001 || Socorro || LINEAR || — || align=right | 1.4 km || 
|-id=856 bgcolor=#E9E9E9
| 225856 ||  || — || December 14, 2001 || Socorro || LINEAR || — || align=right | 2.0 km || 
|-id=857 bgcolor=#E9E9E9
| 225857 ||  || — || December 14, 2001 || Socorro || LINEAR || — || align=right | 1.7 km || 
|-id=858 bgcolor=#E9E9E9
| 225858 ||  || — || December 14, 2001 || Socorro || LINEAR || — || align=right | 1.8 km || 
|-id=859 bgcolor=#E9E9E9
| 225859 ||  || — || December 14, 2001 || Socorro || LINEAR || — || align=right | 2.0 km || 
|-id=860 bgcolor=#E9E9E9
| 225860 ||  || — || December 14, 2001 || Socorro || LINEAR || — || align=right | 1.3 km || 
|-id=861 bgcolor=#E9E9E9
| 225861 ||  || — || December 14, 2001 || Socorro || LINEAR || — || align=right | 2.6 km || 
|-id=862 bgcolor=#E9E9E9
| 225862 ||  || — || December 11, 2001 || Kitt Peak || Spacewatch || — || align=right | 1.8 km || 
|-id=863 bgcolor=#E9E9E9
| 225863 ||  || — || December 11, 2001 || Socorro || LINEAR || — || align=right | 1.6 km || 
|-id=864 bgcolor=#E9E9E9
| 225864 ||  || — || December 11, 2001 || Socorro || LINEAR || — || align=right | 1.2 km || 
|-id=865 bgcolor=#fefefe
| 225865 ||  || — || December 14, 2001 || Socorro || LINEAR || V || align=right | 1.0 km || 
|-id=866 bgcolor=#E9E9E9
| 225866 ||  || — || December 15, 2001 || Socorro || LINEAR || EUN || align=right | 1.5 km || 
|-id=867 bgcolor=#E9E9E9
| 225867 ||  || — || December 15, 2001 || Socorro || LINEAR || — || align=right | 2.1 km || 
|-id=868 bgcolor=#d6d6d6
| 225868 ||  || — || December 15, 2001 || Socorro || LINEAR || 3:2 || align=right | 6.3 km || 
|-id=869 bgcolor=#E9E9E9
| 225869 ||  || — || December 15, 2001 || Socorro || LINEAR || GER || align=right | 2.0 km || 
|-id=870 bgcolor=#E9E9E9
| 225870 ||  || — || December 15, 2001 || Socorro || LINEAR || — || align=right | 1.9 km || 
|-id=871 bgcolor=#E9E9E9
| 225871 ||  || — || December 15, 2001 || Socorro || LINEAR || — || align=right | 1.6 km || 
|-id=872 bgcolor=#fefefe
| 225872 ||  || — || December 10, 2001 || Kitt Peak || Spacewatch || MASfast? || align=right | 1.0 km || 
|-id=873 bgcolor=#E9E9E9
| 225873 ||  || — || December 22, 2001 || Pla D'Arguines || Pla D'Arguines Obs. || — || align=right | 3.6 km || 
|-id=874 bgcolor=#E9E9E9
| 225874 ||  || — || December 23, 2001 || Kingsnake || J. V. McClusky || MAR || align=right | 2.0 km || 
|-id=875 bgcolor=#E9E9E9
| 225875 ||  || — || December 18, 2001 || Socorro || LINEAR || — || align=right | 1.3 km || 
|-id=876 bgcolor=#E9E9E9
| 225876 ||  || — || December 18, 2001 || Socorro || LINEAR || — || align=right | 1.5 km || 
|-id=877 bgcolor=#E9E9E9
| 225877 ||  || — || December 18, 2001 || Socorro || LINEAR || — || align=right | 2.7 km || 
|-id=878 bgcolor=#E9E9E9
| 225878 ||  || — || December 18, 2001 || Socorro || LINEAR || — || align=right | 1.6 km || 
|-id=879 bgcolor=#d6d6d6
| 225879 ||  || — || December 18, 2001 || Socorro || LINEAR || SHU3:2 || align=right | 7.0 km || 
|-id=880 bgcolor=#E9E9E9
| 225880 ||  || — || December 18, 2001 || Socorro || LINEAR || — || align=right | 1.5 km || 
|-id=881 bgcolor=#E9E9E9
| 225881 ||  || — || December 18, 2001 || Socorro || LINEAR || MIS || align=right | 3.0 km || 
|-id=882 bgcolor=#E9E9E9
| 225882 ||  || — || December 18, 2001 || Socorro || LINEAR || — || align=right | 1.8 km || 
|-id=883 bgcolor=#E9E9E9
| 225883 ||  || — || December 18, 2001 || Socorro || LINEAR || — || align=right | 2.1 km || 
|-id=884 bgcolor=#fefefe
| 225884 ||  || — || December 18, 2001 || Socorro || LINEAR || H || align=right data-sort-value="0.92" | 920 m || 
|-id=885 bgcolor=#E9E9E9
| 225885 ||  || — || December 18, 2001 || Socorro || LINEAR || — || align=right | 3.0 km || 
|-id=886 bgcolor=#E9E9E9
| 225886 ||  || — || December 18, 2001 || Socorro || LINEAR || — || align=right | 2.3 km || 
|-id=887 bgcolor=#E9E9E9
| 225887 ||  || — || December 18, 2001 || Socorro || LINEAR || — || align=right | 1.9 km || 
|-id=888 bgcolor=#E9E9E9
| 225888 ||  || — || December 18, 2001 || Anderson Mesa || LONEOS || — || align=right | 3.5 km || 
|-id=889 bgcolor=#E9E9E9
| 225889 ||  || — || December 17, 2001 || Socorro || LINEAR || JUN || align=right | 1.6 km || 
|-id=890 bgcolor=#E9E9E9
| 225890 ||  || — || December 17, 2001 || Socorro || LINEAR || JUN || align=right | 3.0 km || 
|-id=891 bgcolor=#E9E9E9
| 225891 ||  || — || December 17, 2001 || Socorro || LINEAR || — || align=right | 3.3 km || 
|-id=892 bgcolor=#E9E9E9
| 225892 ||  || — || December 17, 2001 || Socorro || LINEAR || — || align=right | 2.6 km || 
|-id=893 bgcolor=#E9E9E9
| 225893 ||  || — || December 17, 2001 || Socorro || LINEAR || — || align=right | 2.2 km || 
|-id=894 bgcolor=#E9E9E9
| 225894 ||  || — || December 18, 2001 || Socorro || LINEAR || — || align=right | 3.6 km || 
|-id=895 bgcolor=#E9E9E9
| 225895 ||  || — || December 19, 2001 || Anderson Mesa || LONEOS || EUN || align=right | 1.9 km || 
|-id=896 bgcolor=#E9E9E9
| 225896 ||  || — || December 19, 2001 || Palomar || NEAT || MAR || align=right | 2.2 km || 
|-id=897 bgcolor=#E9E9E9
| 225897 ||  || — || December 20, 2001 || Palomar || NEAT || — || align=right | 4.3 km || 
|-id=898 bgcolor=#E9E9E9
| 225898 ||  || — || January 6, 2002 || Goodricke-Pigott || R. A. Tucker || — || align=right | 3.5 km || 
|-id=899 bgcolor=#E9E9E9
| 225899 ||  || — || January 6, 2002 || Socorro || LINEAR || — || align=right | 2.3 km || 
|-id=900 bgcolor=#FFC2E0
| 225900 ||  || — || January 7, 2002 || Socorro || LINEAR || APO +1km || align=right | 1.0 km || 
|}

225901–226000 

|-bgcolor=#E9E9E9
| 225901 ||  || — || January 4, 2002 || Haleakala || NEAT || — || align=right | 2.0 km || 
|-id=902 bgcolor=#E9E9E9
| 225902 ||  || — || January 9, 2002 || Socorro || LINEAR || — || align=right | 2.2 km || 
|-id=903 bgcolor=#E9E9E9
| 225903 ||  || — || January 8, 2002 || Palomar || NEAT || — || align=right | 3.9 km || 
|-id=904 bgcolor=#E9E9E9
| 225904 ||  || — || January 8, 2002 || Palomar || NEAT || — || align=right | 1.5 km || 
|-id=905 bgcolor=#E9E9E9
| 225905 ||  || — || January 8, 2002 || Socorro || LINEAR || — || align=right | 2.8 km || 
|-id=906 bgcolor=#fefefe
| 225906 ||  || — || January 9, 2002 || Socorro || LINEAR || — || align=right | 1.3 km || 
|-id=907 bgcolor=#E9E9E9
| 225907 ||  || — || January 9, 2002 || Socorro || LINEAR || — || align=right | 1.5 km || 
|-id=908 bgcolor=#E9E9E9
| 225908 ||  || — || January 9, 2002 || Socorro || LINEAR || — || align=right | 2.0 km || 
|-id=909 bgcolor=#E9E9E9
| 225909 ||  || — || January 9, 2002 || Socorro || LINEAR || — || align=right | 2.4 km || 
|-id=910 bgcolor=#E9E9E9
| 225910 ||  || — || January 9, 2002 || Socorro || LINEAR || MIS || align=right | 3.5 km || 
|-id=911 bgcolor=#E9E9E9
| 225911 ||  || — || January 9, 2002 || Socorro || LINEAR || — || align=right | 3.0 km || 
|-id=912 bgcolor=#E9E9E9
| 225912 ||  || — || January 11, 2002 || Socorro || LINEAR || — || align=right | 3.3 km || 
|-id=913 bgcolor=#E9E9E9
| 225913 ||  || — || January 8, 2002 || Socorro || LINEAR || — || align=right | 1.5 km || 
|-id=914 bgcolor=#E9E9E9
| 225914 ||  || — || January 8, 2002 || Socorro || LINEAR || — || align=right | 2.3 km || 
|-id=915 bgcolor=#E9E9E9
| 225915 ||  || — || January 9, 2002 || Socorro || LINEAR || — || align=right | 2.4 km || 
|-id=916 bgcolor=#E9E9E9
| 225916 ||  || — || January 9, 2002 || Socorro || LINEAR || — || align=right | 1.5 km || 
|-id=917 bgcolor=#E9E9E9
| 225917 ||  || — || January 9, 2002 || Socorro || LINEAR || — || align=right | 1.8 km || 
|-id=918 bgcolor=#E9E9E9
| 225918 ||  || — || January 8, 2002 || Socorro || LINEAR || — || align=right | 1.5 km || 
|-id=919 bgcolor=#E9E9E9
| 225919 ||  || — || January 8, 2002 || Socorro || LINEAR || — || align=right | 1.5 km || 
|-id=920 bgcolor=#E9E9E9
| 225920 ||  || — || January 9, 2002 || Socorro || LINEAR || — || align=right | 1.7 km || 
|-id=921 bgcolor=#E9E9E9
| 225921 ||  || — || January 9, 2002 || Socorro || LINEAR || — || align=right | 1.6 km || 
|-id=922 bgcolor=#E9E9E9
| 225922 ||  || — || January 9, 2002 || Socorro || LINEAR || — || align=right | 1.5 km || 
|-id=923 bgcolor=#E9E9E9
| 225923 ||  || — || January 9, 2002 || Socorro || LINEAR || — || align=right | 1.9 km || 
|-id=924 bgcolor=#E9E9E9
| 225924 ||  || — || January 9, 2002 || Socorro || LINEAR || — || align=right | 2.5 km || 
|-id=925 bgcolor=#E9E9E9
| 225925 ||  || — || January 12, 2002 || Palomar || NEAT || — || align=right | 5.8 km || 
|-id=926 bgcolor=#E9E9E9
| 225926 ||  || — || January 9, 2002 || Socorro || LINEAR || — || align=right | 3.7 km || 
|-id=927 bgcolor=#E9E9E9
| 225927 ||  || — || January 9, 2002 || Socorro || LINEAR || — || align=right | 1.9 km || 
|-id=928 bgcolor=#E9E9E9
| 225928 ||  || — || January 13, 2002 || Socorro || LINEAR || — || align=right | 2.0 km || 
|-id=929 bgcolor=#E9E9E9
| 225929 ||  || — || January 13, 2002 || Socorro || LINEAR || — || align=right | 1.5 km || 
|-id=930 bgcolor=#E9E9E9
| 225930 ||  || — || January 13, 2002 || Socorro || LINEAR || slow || align=right | 1.4 km || 
|-id=931 bgcolor=#E9E9E9
| 225931 ||  || — || January 14, 2002 || Socorro || LINEAR || — || align=right | 1.5 km || 
|-id=932 bgcolor=#E9E9E9
| 225932 ||  || — || January 14, 2002 || Socorro || LINEAR || — || align=right | 1.4 km || 
|-id=933 bgcolor=#E9E9E9
| 225933 ||  || — || January 14, 2002 || Socorro || LINEAR || — || align=right | 2.7 km || 
|-id=934 bgcolor=#E9E9E9
| 225934 ||  || — || January 14, 2002 || Socorro || LINEAR || — || align=right | 1.4 km || 
|-id=935 bgcolor=#E9E9E9
| 225935 ||  || — || January 14, 2002 || Socorro || LINEAR || — || align=right | 1.7 km || 
|-id=936 bgcolor=#E9E9E9
| 225936 ||  || — || January 14, 2002 || Socorro || LINEAR || — || align=right | 2.4 km || 
|-id=937 bgcolor=#fefefe
| 225937 ||  || — || January 6, 2002 || Socorro || LINEAR || H || align=right | 1.3 km || 
|-id=938 bgcolor=#E9E9E9
| 225938 ||  || — || January 8, 2002 || Palomar || NEAT || EUN || align=right | 2.1 km || 
|-id=939 bgcolor=#E9E9E9
| 225939 ||  || — || January 8, 2002 || Socorro || LINEAR || NEM || align=right | 2.8 km || 
|-id=940 bgcolor=#E9E9E9
| 225940 ||  || — || January 8, 2002 || Socorro || LINEAR || HNS || align=right | 1.7 km || 
|-id=941 bgcolor=#E9E9E9
| 225941 ||  || — || January 11, 2002 || Anderson Mesa || LONEOS || — || align=right | 3.3 km || 
|-id=942 bgcolor=#E9E9E9
| 225942 ||  || — || January 13, 2002 || Socorro || LINEAR || — || align=right | 2.0 km || 
|-id=943 bgcolor=#E9E9E9
| 225943 ||  || — || January 8, 2002 || Kitt Peak || Spacewatch || HEN || align=right | 1.3 km || 
|-id=944 bgcolor=#E9E9E9
| 225944 ||  || — || January 18, 2002 || Anderson Mesa || LONEOS || — || align=right | 2.9 km || 
|-id=945 bgcolor=#E9E9E9
| 225945 ||  || — || January 25, 2002 || Socorro || LINEAR || BAR || align=right | 1.5 km || 
|-id=946 bgcolor=#E9E9E9
| 225946 ||  || — || January 23, 2002 || Socorro || LINEAR || MAR || align=right | 1.7 km || 
|-id=947 bgcolor=#E9E9E9
| 225947 ||  || — || January 20, 2002 || Anderson Mesa || LONEOS || — || align=right | 3.2 km || 
|-id=948 bgcolor=#E9E9E9
| 225948 ||  || — || January 20, 2002 || Anderson Mesa || LONEOS || RAF || align=right | 1.5 km || 
|-id=949 bgcolor=#E9E9E9
| 225949 ||  || — || January 21, 2002 || Anderson Mesa || LONEOS || ADE || align=right | 3.9 km || 
|-id=950 bgcolor=#E9E9E9
| 225950 ||  || — || February 3, 2002 || Palomar || NEAT || — || align=right | 1.7 km || 
|-id=951 bgcolor=#E9E9E9
| 225951 ||  || — || February 4, 2002 || Palomar || NEAT || — || align=right | 2.3 km || 
|-id=952 bgcolor=#E9E9E9
| 225952 ||  || — || February 4, 2002 || Haleakala || NEAT || — || align=right | 2.2 km || 
|-id=953 bgcolor=#E9E9E9
| 225953 ||  || — || February 6, 2002 || Haleakala || NEAT || MAR || align=right | 2.6 km || 
|-id=954 bgcolor=#E9E9E9
| 225954 ||  || — || February 6, 2002 || Socorro || LINEAR || — || align=right | 1.3 km || 
|-id=955 bgcolor=#E9E9E9
| 225955 ||  || — || February 6, 2002 || Socorro || LINEAR || — || align=right | 1.3 km || 
|-id=956 bgcolor=#E9E9E9
| 225956 ||  || — || February 6, 2002 || Socorro || LINEAR || ADE || align=right | 3.6 km || 
|-id=957 bgcolor=#E9E9E9
| 225957 ||  || — || February 6, 2002 || Socorro || LINEAR || — || align=right | 1.4 km || 
|-id=958 bgcolor=#E9E9E9
| 225958 ||  || — || February 6, 2002 || Socorro || LINEAR || — || align=right | 3.4 km || 
|-id=959 bgcolor=#E9E9E9
| 225959 ||  || — || February 6, 2002 || Socorro || LINEAR || — || align=right | 1.7 km || 
|-id=960 bgcolor=#E9E9E9
| 225960 ||  || — || February 6, 2002 || Socorro || LINEAR || — || align=right | 2.0 km || 
|-id=961 bgcolor=#E9E9E9
| 225961 ||  || — || February 7, 2002 || Socorro || LINEAR || — || align=right | 2.0 km || 
|-id=962 bgcolor=#E9E9E9
| 225962 ||  || — || February 7, 2002 || Socorro || LINEAR || — || align=right | 2.0 km || 
|-id=963 bgcolor=#d6d6d6
| 225963 ||  || — || February 7, 2002 || Socorro || LINEAR || — || align=right | 4.1 km || 
|-id=964 bgcolor=#E9E9E9
| 225964 ||  || — || February 7, 2002 || Socorro || LINEAR || NEM || align=right | 3.3 km || 
|-id=965 bgcolor=#E9E9E9
| 225965 ||  || — || February 7, 2002 || Socorro || LINEAR || — || align=right | 2.5 km || 
|-id=966 bgcolor=#E9E9E9
| 225966 ||  || — || February 7, 2002 || Socorro || LINEAR || — || align=right | 1.8 km || 
|-id=967 bgcolor=#E9E9E9
| 225967 ||  || — || February 8, 2002 || Socorro || LINEAR || — || align=right | 2.3 km || 
|-id=968 bgcolor=#E9E9E9
| 225968 ||  || — || February 12, 2002 || Desert Eagle || W. K. Y. Yeung || — || align=right | 2.5 km || 
|-id=969 bgcolor=#E9E9E9
| 225969 ||  || — || February 11, 2002 || Bohyunsan || Bohyunsan Obs. || HOF || align=right | 3.7 km || 
|-id=970 bgcolor=#E9E9E9
| 225970 ||  || — || February 7, 2002 || Socorro || LINEAR || — || align=right | 1.4 km || 
|-id=971 bgcolor=#E9E9E9
| 225971 ||  || — || February 8, 2002 || Socorro || LINEAR || WIT || align=right | 1.4 km || 
|-id=972 bgcolor=#E9E9E9
| 225972 ||  || — || February 8, 2002 || Socorro || LINEAR || — || align=right | 1.7 km || 
|-id=973 bgcolor=#E9E9E9
| 225973 ||  || — || February 9, 2002 || Socorro || LINEAR || — || align=right | 1.8 km || 
|-id=974 bgcolor=#E9E9E9
| 225974 ||  || — || February 8, 2002 || Socorro || LINEAR || — || align=right | 3.0 km || 
|-id=975 bgcolor=#E9E9E9
| 225975 ||  || — || February 8, 2002 || Socorro || LINEAR || ADE || align=right | 3.8 km || 
|-id=976 bgcolor=#E9E9E9
| 225976 ||  || — || February 8, 2002 || Socorro || LINEAR || — || align=right | 2.2 km || 
|-id=977 bgcolor=#E9E9E9
| 225977 ||  || — || February 10, 2002 || Socorro || LINEAR || — || align=right | 4.2 km || 
|-id=978 bgcolor=#E9E9E9
| 225978 ||  || — || February 10, 2002 || Socorro || LINEAR || MIS || align=right | 2.8 km || 
|-id=979 bgcolor=#E9E9E9
| 225979 ||  || — || February 10, 2002 || Socorro || LINEAR || — || align=right | 1.8 km || 
|-id=980 bgcolor=#E9E9E9
| 225980 ||  || — || February 10, 2002 || Socorro || LINEAR || AER || align=right | 2.2 km || 
|-id=981 bgcolor=#E9E9E9
| 225981 ||  || — || February 10, 2002 || Socorro || LINEAR || — || align=right | 3.5 km || 
|-id=982 bgcolor=#E9E9E9
| 225982 ||  || — || February 11, 2002 || Socorro || LINEAR || MRX || align=right | 1.4 km || 
|-id=983 bgcolor=#E9E9E9
| 225983 ||  || — || February 15, 2002 || Bergisch Gladbach || W. Bickel || WIT || align=right | 1.5 km || 
|-id=984 bgcolor=#C2FFFF
| 225984 ||  || — || February 6, 2002 || Palomar || NEAT || L4 || align=right | 18 km || 
|-id=985 bgcolor=#d6d6d6
| 225985 ||  || — || February 8, 2002 || Socorro || LINEAR || — || align=right | 4.3 km || 
|-id=986 bgcolor=#E9E9E9
| 225986 ||  || — || February 11, 2002 || Socorro || LINEAR || MIT || align=right | 4.3 km || 
|-id=987 bgcolor=#E9E9E9
| 225987 ||  || — || February 3, 2002 || Anderson Mesa || LONEOS || — || align=right | 2.8 km || 
|-id=988 bgcolor=#E9E9E9
| 225988 ||  || — || February 5, 2002 || Palomar || NEAT || — || align=right | 2.0 km || 
|-id=989 bgcolor=#E9E9E9
| 225989 ||  || — || February 6, 2002 || Anderson Mesa || LONEOS || — || align=right | 1.8 km || 
|-id=990 bgcolor=#E9E9E9
| 225990 ||  || — || February 6, 2002 || Palomar || NEAT || ADE || align=right | 3.1 km || 
|-id=991 bgcolor=#E9E9E9
| 225991 ||  || — || February 7, 2002 || Kitt Peak || M. W. Buie || — || align=right | 1.6 km || 
|-id=992 bgcolor=#E9E9E9
| 225992 ||  || — || February 10, 2002 || Socorro || LINEAR || ADE || align=right | 3.7 km || 
|-id=993 bgcolor=#C2FFFF
| 225993 ||  || — || February 10, 2002 || Socorro || LINEAR || L4 || align=right | 15 km || 
|-id=994 bgcolor=#E9E9E9
| 225994 ||  || — || February 6, 2002 || Palomar || NEAT || — || align=right | 2.1 km || 
|-id=995 bgcolor=#E9E9E9
| 225995 || 2002 DS || — || February 17, 2002 || Needville || Needville Obs. || PAD || align=right | 2.6 km || 
|-id=996 bgcolor=#E9E9E9
| 225996 ||  || — || February 20, 2002 || Kitt Peak || Spacewatch || — || align=right | 3.7 km || 
|-id=997 bgcolor=#E9E9E9
| 225997 ||  || — || February 19, 2002 || Socorro || LINEAR || JUN || align=right | 3.7 km || 
|-id=998 bgcolor=#E9E9E9
| 225998 ||  || — || February 19, 2002 || Socorro || LINEAR || EUN || align=right | 2.2 km || 
|-id=999 bgcolor=#E9E9E9
| 225999 ||  || — || February 19, 2002 || Socorro || LINEAR || — || align=right | 3.6 km || 
|-id=000 bgcolor=#E9E9E9
| 226000 ||  || — || February 20, 2002 || Socorro || LINEAR || BRU || align=right | 5.8 km || 
|}

References

External links 
 Discovery Circumstances: Numbered Minor Planets (225001)–(230000) (IAU Minor Planet Center)

0225